The 1916 Birthday Honours were appointments by King George V to various orders and honours to reward and highlight good works by citizens of the British Empire. The appointments were made to celebrate the official birthday of The King, and were published in The London Gazette and in The Times on 3 June 1916.

Owing to the ongoing War, the 50-page supplement to The Gazette included 3,880 names of recipients of honours, military promotion of rank and medals, including the Military Cross (708 people, among them the Prince of Wales), Distinguished Service Order (373) and 1,217 Military Medals.

In addition, more than 500 nurses from across the British Empire received the Royal Red Cross, a huge number noted by The British Journal of Nursing in its issue on 10 June: "The inclusion of so many members of the nursing profession (516) in the Birthday Honours' list is a unique event, and we most cordially congratulate those Matrons, Sisters and Nurses who have earned this distinction, while we bear in mind many others whose splendid work merits recognition."

The recipients of honours are displayed here as they were styled before their new honour, and arranged by honour, with classes (Knight, Knight Grand Cross, etc.) and then divisions (Military, Civil, etc.) as appropriate.

United Kingdom and British Empire

Baron
The Rt. Hon. Sir Savile Brinton Crossley  by the name, style and title of Baron Somerleyton of Somerleyton in the county of Suffolk.
The Rt. Hon. Sir Arthur Nicolson  by the name, style and title of Baron Carnock of Carnock in the county of Stirling.
Tonman Mosley  by the name, style and title of Baron Anslow of Iver in the county of Buckingham.
George Coats, by the name, style and title of Baron Glentanar of Glen Tanar in the county of Aberdeen.
Charles Edward Hungerford Atholl Colston, by the name, style and title of Baron Roundway of Devizes in the county of Wiltshire.

Privy Councillor
The King appointed the following to His Majesty's Most Honourable Privy Council:
Christopher Addison 
Charles William Bowerman 
Sir Gilbert Parker 
Sir Harry Simon Samuel 
The Hon. Sir George Eulas Foster

Baronetcies
Sir William Maxwell Aitken 
Sir Robert Hudson Borwick
Arthur Philip du Cros
Thomas Lane Devitt
Thomas Dunlop
Bertram Godfray Falle
Major the Hon. Eustace Edward Twisleton-Wykeham-Fiennes
Sir Edward Holt
Sir Algernon Marshall Stedman Methuen
Ernest William Moir
Cyril Arthur Pearson
William James Tatem

Knight Bachelor

James Tynte Agg-Gardner 
John Anthony of Dalmeny, Dumbreck, Glasgow
George Thomas Beilby 
Arthur William Binning
Thomas Collins, Chief Inspector, Board of Inland Revenue.
Theodore Andrea Cook, Editor of The Field
John Henry Corke, Mayor of Portsmouth
George Doolette, President of the Australian Voluntary Hospital at Wimereux.
Arthur Isaac Durrant  Comptroller of the Supplies Division, Office of Works
Francis Mark Farmer
William Gallagher  Chief Inspector, Board of Customs
Eric C. Geddes, Deputy Director-General of Munitions Supply.
William B. Gentle, Chief Constable of Brighton
George Greenwood 
William Peter Griggs
Maurice Hill 
David Hope Kyd 
Robert Morris Liddell  High Sheriff of County Down.
Alfred Henry Herbert Matthews, Secretary of the Central Chamber of Agriculture
Commander Edward Nicholl 
John James Oddy 
Robert Pearce 
Alexander William Prince, managing director of the Navy and Army Canteen Board
George Heynes Radford 
Archibald Tutton Salvidge
Henry Smith, Deputy Lieutenant for the City of London.
Jethro Justinian Harris Teall 
Professor Nestor Isidore Charles Tirard 
Glynn Hamilton West, deputy director, General of Munitions Supply
Frederick Whitley Whitley-Thomson 

Colonies, Protectorates, etc.
The Hon. Marshall Campbell, Senator of the Union of South Africa
The Hon. Wallace Graham, Chief Justice of the Supreme Court of Nova Scotia
The Hon. Pierre-Amand Landry, Chief Justice of the King's Bench Division of the Supreme Court of New Brunswick
The Hon. Frederic William Lang, Speaker of the House of Representatives of the Dominion of New Zealand
The Hon. Robert Furse McMillan, Chief Justice of Western Australia
The Hon. Herbert Nicholls, Chief Justice of the Supreme Court of Tasmania
Gilbert Kenelm Treffry Purcell, Chief Justice of the Colony of Sierra Leone
Robert Frederic Stupart, Director of the Meteorological Service of Canada
The Hon. Antonie Gysbert Viljoen, Senator of the Union of South Africa

British India
Herbert Stanley Reed  Editor of The Times of India
Ratanji Jamshedji Tata 
Francis Hugh Stewart 
Charles William Chitty, a Puisne Judge of the High Court of Judicature at Fort William in Bengal
Robert Swan Highet, General Manager of the East India Railway

The Most Honourable Order of the Bath

Knight Grand Cross of the Order of the Bath (GCB)

Military Division
Royal Navy
Admiral Sir George Astley Callaghan 

Army
General Sir William Henry Mackinnon , Colonel, King's Regiment (Liverpool)

Civil Division
The Rt. Hon. Sir John Hay Athole Macdonald 
Lt.-Col. The Rt. Hon. Sir Arthur Bigge, Baron Stamfordham 
The Rt. Hon. Sir Francis John Stephens Hopwood

Knight Commander of the Order of the Bath (KCB)
Military Division
Army
Major-General Launcelot Edward Kiggell 
Major-General George Henry Fowke 
Major-General John Philip Du Cane 
Major-General Charles Ernest Heath 

Civil Division
Bernard Mallet , Registrar-General.
Robert Henry Rew , Assistant Secretary, Board of Agriculture.
William Gibbs Turpin , Controller-General, National Debt Office.

Companion of the Order of the Bath (CB)
Military Division
Royal Navy
Capt. Edwyn Sinclair Alexander-Sinclair  (Commodore, 2nd Class)
Rear-Admiral Sir Robert Keith Arbuthnot 
Rear-Admiral Montague Edward Browning 
Capt. George Cuthbert Cayley
Capt. Alfred Ernle Montacute Chatfield 
Capt. Alfred Astley Ellison
Rear-Admiral Hugh Evan-Thomas 
Fleet Paymaster Walter Gask
Engineer Capt. Donald Percy Green
Capt. William Edmund Goodenough  (Commodore, 2nd Class)
Capt. Lionel Halsey  (Commodore, 1st Class)
Rear-Admiral Herbert Leopold Heath 
Engineer Capt. Fred Hore
Fleet Surgeon Ernest Courtney Lomas DSO MB FRCSE 
Rear-Admiral Trevylyan Dacres Willes Napier 
Lt.-Col. Cecil Alvend FitzHerbert Osmaston, Royal Marine Artillery
Fleet Paymaster Montague Stephens
Vice-Admiral Reginald Godfrey Otway Tupper 
Capt. Drury St. Aubyn Wake (Commodore, 2nd Class)

Army
Lt.-Col. and Brevet Col. Frederick Gore Anley, Essex Regiment
Lt.-Col. and Brevet Col. Colin Robert Ballard, Norfolk Regiment
Col. Reginald Walter Ralph Barnes 
Surg.-General Walter George Augustus Bedford  MB
Col. Thomas Arthur Hastings Bigge
Lt.-Col. and Brevet Col. James Frederick Noel Birch  Royal Artillery
Lt.-Col. and Brevet Col. Wilkinson Dent Bird 
Col. Edward Humphry Bland
Col. David Graham Mushcet Campbell
Lt.-Col. and Brevet Col. George Glas Sandeman Carey, Royal Artillery
Lt.-Col. Beresford Cecil Molyneux Carter , The King's (Liverpool Regiment)
Col. Charles Marling Cartwright
Lt.-Col. and Brevet Col. Skipton Hill Climo , Indian Army
Lt.-Col. George Kynaston Cockerill
Col. Francis William Henry Cox, Indian Army, Assistant Quartermaster-General, Burma Division
Lt.-Col. Charles Chevin Cumming MB, Royal Army Medical Corps
Col. Henry Rodolph Davies
Lt.-Col. and Brevet Col. Frank Seymour Derham
Col. Lionel Dorling 
Col. Lionel Charles Dunsterville , Indian Army, Brigade Commander, Peshawar (Infantry) Brigade
Lt.-Col. Frederick Kendall Fair, Royal Engineers
Lt.-Col. and Brevet Col. Geoffrey Percy Thynne Feilding , Coldstream Guards
Col. Herbert Cokayne Frith
Col. Henry Edward Fane Goold-Adams 
Lt.-Col. John Lewis Randolph Gordon, 15th Sikhs, Indian Army
Col. Henry West Hodgson 
Col. John Hotham
Lt.-Col. and Brevet Col. Charles Patrick Amyatt Hull, late The Duke of Cambridge's Own, Middlesex Regiment
Temp. Col. George Gillett Hunter , Egyptian Government Service
Col. Oliver Richard Archer Julian 
Col. Hugh Kennedy, Indian Army
Col. Edward Ranulph Kenyon
Lt.-Col. and Brevet Col. Geoffrey Chicheley Kemp, Royal Engineers
Col. Algernon D'Aguila King 
Col. Richard Harman Luce MB 
Lt.-Col. and Brevet Col. Arthur George Marrable, The King's Own (Yorkshire Light Infantry)
Col. Frank Broadwood Matthews 
Lt.-Col. and Brevet Col. Frederick Lansdowne Morrison, Highland Light Infantry
Col. Edward Alfred Moulton-Barrett 
Col. Lewis Loyd Nicol
Surg.-General Thomas Joseph O'Donnell 
Lt.-Col. Ralph Glyn Ouseley  Royal Artillery
Col. St. John William Topp Parker
Lt.-Col. Ernest Moncrieff Paul, Royal Engineers
Col. Hugh Whitchurch Perry
Col. Arthur Phelps
Surg.-General Robert Porter MB
Col. Ernest St. George Pratt 
Lt.-Col. Richard Thomas Incledon Ridgway, 33rd Punjabis, Indian Army
Lt.-Col. Godfrey Walker Robinson, 27th Punjabis, Indian Army
Col. Acton Lemuel Schreiber 
Lt.-Col. Charles Hamilton Seville, S. and T. Corps, Indian Army
Col. Cameron Deane Shute
Col. Arnold Frederick Sillem
Col. Sydenham Campbell Urquhart Smith
Col. Edward Taylor
Lt.-Col. Henry Fleetwood Thuillier , Royal Engineers
Col. Julian Dallas Tyndale Tyndale-Biscoe
Lt.-Col. Henry Osman Vincent, Royal Artillery
Australian Imperial Force
Lt.-Col. and Hon. Col. John Paton, 25th Battalion
Lt.-Col. William Walter Russell Watson, 24th Battalion
Lt.-Col. John Lamrock, 20th Battalion

South African Defence Forces
Brigadier-General Henry Timson Lukin 

Civil Division
William Henry Beveridge, Assistant Secretary, Board of Trade
Col. Alfred Percy Blenkinsop, Assistant Director-General, Army Medical Service
Col. William Frederick Cleeve, Retired, late Royal Artillery
Col. Charles Frederick Close, late Royal Engineers, Director-General, Ordnance Survey
Lt.-Col. and Honorary Col. Cecil Hodgson Colvin , Special Reserve (Capt., retired), The Essex Regiment
Acting Capt. Thomas Evans Crease  (retired)
Surgeon-General John Jeffreys Dennis MD RN
Col. William Elliot, Retired, late Royal Artillery
Engineer Rear-Admiral Ernest Frank Ellis
Norman Fenwick Warren Fisher, deputy chairman, Board of Inland Revenue
William Henry Gard . (Royal Corps of Naval Constructors)
Lt.-Col. Vivian Henry, Special Reserve (Major, Reserve of Officers), Commanding 5th Battalion (Reserve), The Royal Fusiliers (City of London Regiment)
Major-General Hugh Palliser Hickman, late Royal Artillery
Lt.-Col. Norman Mackenzie Hemming, Royal Engineers, Superintendent of Building Works, Royal Arsenal
Thomas Beaumont Hohler, H.M. Chargé d'Affaires in Mexico
Major Percy Samuel Lelean, Royal Army Medical Corps, Assistant Professor, Royal Army Medical College
George Evelyn Pemberton Murray, Secretary to the Post Office
Col. Charles Edwin Nuthall, Deputy Director-General, Army Veterinary Service
Edmund Bampfylde Phipps, Principal Assistant Secretary, Board of Education
Capt. John Franklin Parry 
Capt. Hugh Francis Paget Sinclair 
Capt. Matthew Henry Phineas Riall Sankey, late Royal Engineers
The Hon. Arthur Stanley 
Sir Hugh Shaw Stewart 
Lt.-Col. Sir Richard Carnac Temple 
David James Shackleton, Member of the National Health Insurance Commission (England)
Lt.-Col. John Frederick Stenning, Officers Training Corps (Oxford University)
Aubrey Vere Symonds, Assistant Secretary, Local Government Board
Col. Sir Courtauld Thomson
Basil Home Thomson, Assistant Commissioner of Police
Thomas Mitchell Williams
Ulick Fitzgerald Wintour , Director of Contracts, War Office

Order of Merit (OM)
The Rt. Hon. Arthur James Balfour

The Most Exalted Order of the Star of India

Knight Commander (KCSI)
Alexander Gordon Cardew , Indian Civil Service, an Ordinary Member of the Council of the Governor of Fort St. George, Madras.
Lt.-Col. Sir Hugh Daly , Indian Army, lately Resident in Mysore and Chief Commissioner, Coorg.

Companion (CSI)
Lt.-Col. Stephen Lushington Aplin, Indian Army, Commissioner of the Mandalay Division, Burma.
Sir James Houssemayne Du Boulay , Indian Civil Service, lately Private Secretary to the Viceroy and Governor-General of India.
John Ghest Cumming , Indian Civil Service, Chief Secretary to the Government of Bengal, on special duty, and an Additional Member of the Council of the Governor-General for making Laws and Regulations.
Laurence Robertson, Indian Civil Service, Secretary to the Government of Bombay, Political and Judicial Departments.
John Barry Wood , Indian Civil Service, Secretary to the Government of India in the Foreign and Political Department, and an Additional Member of the Council of the Governor-General for making Laws and Regulations.

Honorary Companion
His Excellency Sheikh Jaber bin Mubarak bin Sabah, Sheikh of Kuwait and Dependencies.

The Most Distinguished Order of Saint Michael and Saint George

Knight Grand Cross of the Order of St Michael and St George (GCMG)
His Excellency the Rt. Hon. Sir Cecil Arthur Spring Rice , His Majesty's Ambassador Extraordinary and Plenipotentiary to the United States of America.
Sir Arthur Henderson Young , Governor and Commander-in-Chief of the Straits Settlements.

Knight Commander of the Order of St Michael and St George (KCMG)
Edward John Cameron , Governor and Commander-in-Chief of the Colony of the Gambia.
His Honour Pierre-Évariste Leblanc , Lieutenant-Governor of the Province of Quebec.
The Hon. James Alexander Lougheed , Minister without Portfolio and Leader of the Government in the Senate, Dominion of Canada.
Brigadier-General Alfred William Robin , Commandant of the New Zealand Military Forces.
Walter Baldwin Spencer , Professor of Biology, University of Melbourne, and Director of the National Museum of Natural History, Geology and Ethnology, Melbourne.
John Henry Birchenough , In recognition of services in connection with Rhodesia.
Mansfeldt de Cardonnel Findlay , His Majesty's Envoy Extraordinary and Minister Plenipotentiary to His Majesty the King of Norway.
Charles Murray Marling , His Majesty's Envoy Extraordinary and Minister Plenipotentiary at Tehran.
Col. William Daniel Campbell Williams , Hon. Surgeon-General Australian Army Medical Corps.

Honorary Knights Commander
His Highness Tunku Mohamed, Yang di Pertuan Besar of the Negri Sembilan

Companion of the Order of St Michael and St George (CMG)
Peter Board MA, Under Secretary to the Department of Public Instruction and Director of Education, State of New South Wales
Henry Roland Murray Bourne, Secretary for Defence, Union of South Africa
Charles Bell Child Clipperton, His Majesty's Consul-General at Rouen
Archibald Samuel Cooper, General Manager of the Nigerian Railway
Lt.-Col. Thomas Astley Cubitt , lately Officer Commanding Troops and Deputy Commissioner, Somaliland Protectorate
Cecil Clementi MA, Government Secretary of the Colony of British Guiana
Laurence Fortescue , Comptroller of the Royal North-West Mounted Police, Dominion of Canada
Bertram Giles, His Majesty's Consul at Nanking
Alexander Granville, Director-General of the Municipality in Cairo
Barry May, Treasurer and Deputy Resident Commissioner of Basutoland
Allan Maclean, His Majesty's Consul-General at Valparaiso
Col. Henry Huntly Leith Malcolm , lately Officer Commanding the Troops, Ceylon
Henry William le Messurier, Assistant Collector and Deputy Minister of Customs, Newfoundland
Alfred Henry Miles , Collector-General, Revenue Department, Island of Jamaica
Frederick Montizambert , Director-General of Public Health, Dominion of Canada
Edward Augustus Petherick, Archivist in the Library of the Parliament of the Commonwealth of Australia
Alexander Ransford Slater, Colonial Secretary of the Gold Coast
Ronald Storrs, Oriental Secretary at His Majesty's Residency, Cairo

Additional Companions for services rendered in connection with Military Operations in the Field:

Major Leonard Henry Abbott, 11th Rajputs, Indian Army
Temp. Lt.-Col. Charles Murray Abercrombie, Lancashire Fusiliers
Lt.-Col. Hugh Morris Allen , Royal Highlanders
Major and Brevet Lt.-Col. Nelson Graham Anderson , Army Service Corps
Lt.-Col. (temp. Col.) John Cecil Armstrong, Army Pay Dept
Lt.-Col. Ben Atkinson, Royal Artillery
Col. Charles Edward Baddeley
Lt.-Col. Walter Edward Banbury, Indian Army, Nottinghamshire and Derbyshire Regiment
Col. Albert Louis Frederick Bate, Army Medical Service
Col. Thomas Boswall Beach, Army Medical Service
Lt.-Col. Maurice Hugh Lowthian Bell, Yorkshire Regiment
Lt.-Col. Henry Lawrence Norman Beynon, Royal Artillery
Major William James Bowker , Somerset Light Infantry
Major and Brevet Lt.-Col. Lionel Boyd Boyd-Moss, South Staffordshire Regiment
Lt.-Col. Frederick Gardner Bradley, North Staffordshire Regiment
Lt.-Col. Hubert Alaric Bray, Royal Army Medical Corps
Lt.-Col. Edward Part Brooker, Royal Engineers
Lt.-Col. William Basil Browell, Royal Artillery
Lt.-Col. Ernest Sumner Burder, late Duke of Cornwall's Light Infantry
Lt.-Col. and Brevet Col. Harry Nichol Byass, York and Lancaster Regiment
Major and Brevet Lt.-Col. Neville John Gordon Cameron, Cameron Highlanders
Lt.-Col. Albert Canning, Leinster Regiment, Special Reserve
Major John William Vincent Carroll, Norfolk Regiment
Lt.-Col. and Brevet Col. Alfred Henry Carter, Royal Artillery
Lt.-Col. Lawrence Joseph Chapman, Royal Artillery
Major Lionel Evelyn Oswald Charlton , Lancashire Fusiliers and Royal Flying Corps
Lt.-Col. and Hon. Col. Sir James Richardson Andrew Clark , Royal Army Medical Corps (Unattached List)
Lt.-Col. John Lewis Justice Clarke, East Yorkshire Regiment
Lt.-Col. Lewis Henry Close, Royal Engineers
Lt.-Col. John Henry Collett, Gloucestershire Regiment
Major-General George Arthur Cookson , Indian Army
Capt. and Hon. Major (temp. Major) Arthur Annerley Corder, late Major, attached Advanced Ordnance Depot
Lt.-Col. Montagu Cradock , 2nd King Edward's Horse
Lt.-Col. George Standish Gage Craufurd , Gordon Highlanders
Lt.-Col. Charles Douglas Parry Crooke, Suffolk Regiment
Lt.-Col. Edward George Curtis, Northamptonshire Regiment
Major Thomas Wilkinson Cuthbert , Seaforth Highlanders Res
Major-General John Frederic Daniell, Royal Marine Light Infantry
Major Henry Clayton Darlington, Manchester Regiment
Lt.-Col. (temp. Col.) George Freshfield Davies, Army Service Corps
Major Charles Parker Deedes , Yorkshire Light Infantry
Col. George Cecil Dowell
Capt. Sidney Robert Drury-Lowe 
Lt.-Col. John Duncan , Royal Scots Fusiliers
Col. John Charles Basil Eastwood, Reserve of Officers
Lt.-Col. Lionel William Pellew East , Royal Artillery
Col. James Edward Edmonds 
Lt.-Col. Roderick Mackenzie Edwards, retired, Indian Army, East Yorkshire Regiment
Lt.-Col. Edward Henry Eley, Royal Field Artillery
Major and Brevet Lt.-Col. Edward Leonard Ellington, Royal Artillery
Lt.-Col. James George Fair , Reserve of Officers
Major Ronald D'Arcy Fife, Yorkshire Regiment
Lt.-Col. Edward Heneage Finch-Hatton , East Kent Regiment
Lt.-Col. Charles Leonard Flick, Essex Regiment
The Rev. William Forrest, Chaplain, 2nd Class, Army Chaplain Department
Lt.-Col. John Vincent Forrest MB, Royal Army Medical Corps
Major James Forrest, Lincolnshire Regiment
Major James William Fraser, temp. Major, Seaforth Highlanders
Lt.-Col. Lyons David Fraser, Royal Artillery
Col. Ernest Carrick Freeman MD, Army Medical Service
Temp. Col. Andrew Fullerton MD , Army Medical Service
Lt.-Col. Francis George Fuller, Royal Engineers
Major James Robert Gaussen , South Wales Borderers
Lt.-Col. Lionel Guy Gisborne, Royal Field Artillery
Major Godfrey Davenport Goodman, Nottinghamshire and Derbyshire Regiment 3 Territorial Force
Col. Charles Gosling
Col. Sylvester Bertram Grimston, 18th Lancers, Indian Army
Major George Lytton Grossman , West Yorkshire Regiment
Col. Thomas Wyatt Hale, Advanced Ordnance Depot
Major George Hall MD, Royal Army Medical Corps
Col. Charles Edward Harrison  MB, Army Medical Service
Col. Gilbert Harwood Harrison
Lt.-Col. Henry John Haslegrave, Yorkshire Light Infantry
Col. Coryndon William Rutherford Healey, Army Medical Service
Lt.-Col. Francis William Heath, Royal Artillery
Major Andrew Henderson, Durham Light Infantry
Lt.-Col. James Dalgleish Heriot-Maitland , Rifle Brigade
Major Edward Vincent Osborne Hewett, South Wales Borderers
Lt.-Col. Lyone John Hext, Royal Artillery
Lt.-Col. Edward Andus Hirst, Royal Field Artillery
Major Hardress Gilbert Holmes, Yorkshire Regiment
Principal Chaplain the Rev. Arthur Venables Calvely Hordern, Army Chaplains' Department
Major and Brevet Lt.-Col. Gwyn Venables Hordern, King's Royal Rifle Corps
Major and Brevet Col. Arthur Reginald Hoskins , North Staffordshire Regiment
Lt.-Col. Arthur Benison Hubback, 20th Battalion, London Regiment
Temp. Lt.-Col. James Frederick Humby , Nottinghamshire and Derbyshire Regiment
Lt.-Col. Lawrence Humphry, Royal Army Medical Corps
Lt.-Col. Herbert Ellison Rhodes James , Royal Army Medical Corps
Major and Brevet Lt.-Col. James Bruce Jardine , 5th Lancers
Major and Brevet Lt.-Col. Gladwyn Dundas Jebb , Bedfordshire Regiment
Major Algernon Cautley Jeffcoat , Royal Fusiliers
Major and Brevet Lt.-Col. George Darell Jeffreys, Grenadier Guards
Lt.-Col. Michael Derwas Goring Jones, Durham Light Infantry
Major and Brevet Lt.-Col. Leslie Cockburn Jones , 7th Lancers, Indian Army
Lt.-Col. Theophilus Percy Jones MB, Royal Army Medical Corps
Major Henry Karslake , Royal Artillery
Lt.-Col. William Martin Kay, Scottish Rifles
Lt.-Col. Kempster Kenmure Knapp, Royal Artillery
Major George Edmund Reginald Kenrick , Royal West Surrey Regiment
Major Charles Arthur Ker , Royal Artillery
Lt.-Col. Edwin James King, Middlesex Regiment
Commander Dennis Augustus Hugo Larking  (retired)
Col. George Francis Leverson 
Lt.-Col. Arthur Corrie Lewin , Special Reserve
Lt.-Col. Arthur Hugh Lister MB, Royal Army Medical Corps
Major Thomas Owen Lloyd, Royal Highlanders
Major and Brevet Lt.-Col. James Atkinson Longridge, 43rd Regiment, Indian Army
Lt.-Col. Francis Lyon , Royal Artillery
Major Donald Florence MacCarthy-Morrogh, Royal Munster Fusiliers, Special Reserve
Major Charles Lane Magniac, Royal Engineers
Fleet-Paymaster Henry Wilfred Eldon Manisty 
Lt.-Col. Ernest Edmund Martin , Army Veterinary Corps
Lt.-Col. Frederick Guy Maunsell, Royal Artillery
Lt.-Col. Alexander Anderson McHardy , Royal Artillery
Capt. Malcolm McNeill , Argyll and Sutherland Highlanders
Lt.-Col. Frank Hermann Moline, Army Pay Department
Col. Sir Robert Drummond Moncreiffe  Royal Highlanders
Col. Herbert Montgomery-Campbell (late Royal Artillery)
Temp. Lt.-Col. David Simpson Morton, Highland Light Infantry
Lt.-Col. Edward Spencer Hoare Nairne, Royal Artillery
Major Walter Gordon Neilson , Argyll and Sutherland Highlanders
Lt.-Col. Augustus Charles Newsom, Army Veterinary Corps
Col. Cecil Lothian Nicholson, East Lancashire Regiment
Temp. Lt.-Col. Reginald Lewis Norrington, Border Regiment
Lt-Col. and Brevet Col. Lionel Grant Oliver, late Middlesex Regiment
Lt.-Col. Frederick Cunliffe Owen, Royal Artillery
Temp. Lt.-Col. Albert Ingraham Paine , King's Royal Rifle Corps
Lt.-Col. Henry Ingham Evered Palmer, Indian Army
Major Alphonse Eugene Panet, Royal Engineers
Surgeon Major Basil Pares , Royal Horse Guards
Major Walter Mansel Parker, Army Service Corps
Lt.-Col. and Brevet Col. Oswald Pearce-Serocold, Royal Berkshire Regiment
Capt. Maurice Loraine Pears, Northumberland Fusiliers
Lt.-Col. Henry Cecil Petre, late Rifle Brigade
Col. George Fraser Phillips
Lt.-Col. Louis Murray Phillpotts , Royal Artillery
Lt.-Col. Grenville Edmund Pigott , Army Service Corps
Hon. Brigadier-General Joseph Howard Poett 
Major Aubrey Gordon Pritchard, 2nd Lancers, Indian Army, attached Royal Warwickshire Regiment
Major and Brevet Lt.-Col. Charles Herbert Rankin , 7th Hussars
Major Robert Frederick Ratcliff, North Staffordshire Regiment
Major Cecil Godfrey Rawling , Somerset Light Infantry, commanding officer, Service Battalion
Commander Alfred Rawlinson 
Major and Brevet Lt.-Col. Felix Fordati Ready , Royal Berkshire Regiment
Temp. Lt.-Col. William Henry Ritson, Northumberland Fusiliers
Lt.-Col. Oliver Long Robinson, Royal Army Medical Corps
Lt.-Col. John Guy Rotton, Royal Artillery
Lt.-Col. and Brevet Col. Francis John Ryder
Major Charles Philip Scudamore , late Royal Scots Fusiliers
Major Thomas Byrne Sellar, King's Own Scottish Borderers
Col. Hugh Pentland Shekleton 
Major Charles William Singer , Royal Engineers
Lt.-Col. Edward Stockley Sinnott , Royal Engineers
Lt.-Col. (temp. Col.) Edward Wheeler Slayter MB, Royal Army Medical Corps
Lt.-Col. Arthur Solly-Flood , 4th Dragoon Guards
Rev. Canon Henry Kemble Southwell MA, Chaplain 1st Class, Army Chaplains' Department
Lt.-Col. George Redesdale Brooker Spain, Northumberland Fusiliers
Lt.-Col. Richard Sparrow, 7th Dragoon Guards
Major-General James Spens 
Major Hon. George Frederic Stanley, Royal Artillery
Capt. Logan Sutherland Stansfeld  |(retired)
Lt.-Col. Charles John Steavenson, Liverpool Regiment
Major Charles Merton Stephen, Advanced Ordnance Depot
Lt.-Col. and Brevet Col. Reginald Byng Stephens, Rifle Brigade
Col. Alfred Stokes 
Lt.-Col. Adolphe Symons, 13th Hussars
Col. John Arthur Tanner 
Lt.-Col. Walter John Tatam, Army Veterinary Corps
Col. Henry Neville Thompson  MB, Army Medical Service
Lt.-Col. George Sinclair Thorn MB, Royal Army Medical Corps
Col. Gervase Francis Newport Tinley , Indian Army
Lt.-Col. John Tonge, Royal Field Artillery
Lt.-Col. George Alexander Trent, Northamptonshire Regiment
Lt.-Col. William Duncan Conybeare Trimnell, Army Ordnance Department
Major and Brevet Lt.-Col. Gerald Frederic Trotter , Grenadier Guards
Lt.-Col. Edward George Troyte-Bullock, Dorset Yeomanry
Major William John Bell Tweedie, Argyll and Sutherland Highlanders
Lt.-Col. James Arbuthnot Tyler, Royal Artillery
Lt.-Col. and Brevet Col. Herbert Crofton Campbell Uniacke, Royal Artillery
Lt.-Col. Ernest Vaux , Durham Light Infantry
Lt.-Col. George Vawdrey, Army Service Corps
Major Evelyn Fountaine Villiers , Royal Sussex Regiment
Major Berkeley Vincent, 6th Dragoons
Lt.-Col. Henry Bertram des Voeux, Royal Engineers
Col. William Crawford Walton, Indian Army
Lt.-Col. Harry Dudley Ossulston Ward, Royal Artillery
Major and Hon. Lt.-Col. Thomas Ward, Denbigh Hussars Yeomanry
Temp. Lt.-Col. William Watson, Staff
Lt.-Col. Malcolm Hammond Edward Welch, Royal Irish Regiment
Lt.-Col. Francis Owen Wethered, Royal Warwickshire Regiment
Major Hon. Robert White, Royal Fusiliers
Col. and Hon. Brigadier-General William Lewis White 
Lt.-Col. Edward Dalrymple White, Oxfordshire and Buckinghamshire Light Infantry
Lt.-Col. Edward Nathan Whitley, Royal Field Artillery
Major Walter Temple Willcox, 3rd Hussars
Temp. Lt.-Col. William Henry Willcox MD , Royal Army Medical Corps
Lt.-Col. Sydney Frederick Williams, Royal Engineers
Col. James Barnett Wilson, Army Medical Service
Major Arthur Herbert Windsor, 11th Battalion, London Regiment
Col. Alfred Woodrow Stanley Wingate, Ret. Indian Army
Lt.-Col. and Brevet Col. Thomas Birchall Wood, Royal Artillery

Australian Imperial Force
Col. William Holmes , Commonwealth Military Forces
Brevet Lt.-Col. John Macquarie Antill , Staff
Lt.-Col. Cecil Henry Foott, Staff
Lt.-Col. John Patrick McGlinn, Staff
Lt.-Col. Alfred Moon, Army Service Corps
Lt.-Col. Bernard James Newmarch, Australian Medical Corps
Lt.-Col. Lachlan Chisholm Wilson, 5th Light Horse Regiment
Major Thomas William Glasgow , 2nd Light Horse Regiment
Major Stephen Midgley , 5th Light Horse Regiment
The Rev. Frederick William Wray, Chaplain 2nd Class

Canadian Contingent
Col. Percival Edward Thacker
Lt.-Col. William Okell Holden Dodds, Canadian Artillery
Lt.-Col. John Fletcher Leopold Embury, 28th Battalion
Lt.-Col. (temp. Col.) John Taylor Fotheringham, Army Medical Corps
Lt.-Col. Henry Thoresby Hughes, Canadian Engineers
Lt.-Col. William Bethune Lindsay, Canadian Engineers
Lt.-Col. Archibald Hayes Macdonell , Royal Canadian Regiment
Lt.-Col. Henri-Alexandre Panet , Royal Canadian Horse Artillery
Lt.-Col. Colin Worthington Pope Ramsey, Canadian Engineers
Lt.-Col. Herbert Cyril Thacker, Canadian Local Forces
Hon. Lt.-Col. The Rev. John Macpherson Almond, Chaplain
Hon. Major The Rev. William Beattie, Chaplain

New Zealand Imperial Force
Lt.-Col. Walter William Alderman, Auckland Battalion
Lt.-Col. Alexander Burnett Charters
Lt.-Col. Percival Clennell Fenwick MB, Med. Corps
Major The Rev. John Alfred Luxford, Chaplain 3rd Class, N.Z. Chaplain Department

South African Forces
Lt.-Col. Frederick Stewart Dawson, 1st S.A. Infantry
Lt.-Col. Frank Aubrey Jones , 4th S.A. Infantry
Lt.-Col. William Ernest Collins Tanner, 2nd S.A. Infantry
Lt.-Col. Edward Francis Thackeray, 3rd S.A. Infantry

Honorary Companion
Charles de Rocca-Serra, Legal Adviser to the President of the Council of Ministers in Cairo.

The Most Eminent Order of the Indian Empire

Knight Grand Commander (GCIE)

Honorary Knight Grand Commander
His Excellency Sardar Arfa, Amir Nuyan Sheikh Khazal Khan ibn Haji Jabir Khan , Sheikh of Mohammerah.

Knight Commander (KCIE)
Nawab Syed Shams-ul-Huda MA, an Ordinary Member of the Council of the Governor of Bengal.
Raja Rampal Singh , Taluqdar of Kurri Sidhauli, Rae Bareli District, United Provinces, and a Member of the Council of the Lieutenant-Governor for making Laws and Regulations.
Alexander Henderson Diack , Indian Civil Service, Financial Commissioner, Punjab.
Sao Mawng  KSM, Sawbwa of Yawnghwe, Burma, and a Member of the Council of the Lieutenant-Governor for making Laws and Regulations.
His Highness Raja Arjun Singh, Chief of Narsingarh, Central India.
Capt. Malik Umar Hayat Khan , of Kalra, in the Shahpur District, Punjab, an Additional Member of the Council of the Governor-General for making Laws and Regulations, in recognition of services during the War.

Companion (CIE)
Col. William Montague Ellis, Royal Engineers, Chief Engineer and Secretary to the Government of Madras, Public Works Department, and an Additional Member of the Council of the Governor for making Laws and Regulations.
Raja Venganad Vasudeva Raja Avargal, Valiya Nambidi of Kollengode, Malabar District, Madras.
Lt.-Col. James Jackson MB, Indian Medical Service, Inspector-General of Prisons, Bombay, and an Additional Member of the Council of the Governor for making Laws and Regulations.
James Anderson Dickson McBain, Honorary Secretary, Women's Branch, War and Relief Fund, Member of the Bombay Municipal Corporation, and an Additional Member of the Council of the Governor for making Laws and Regulations.
Rao Bahadur Ganesh Krishna Sathe, Assistant Public Prosecutor, Sholapur Bombay, and an Additional Member of the Council of the Governor for making Laws and Regulations.
Christopher Addams-Williams, Public Works Department, Superintending Engineer, South-Western Circle, Bengal.
Raj Bansidhar Banerjee Bahadur, Provincial Executive Service, Second Land Acquisition Officer, Calcutta, Bengal.
Hammett Reginald Clode Hailey, Indian Civil Service, Director of Land Records and Agriculture, United Provinces, and a Member of the Council of the Lieutenant-Governor for making Laws and Regulations.
Robert Thomas Dundas, Indian Police, Inspector-General of Police, Bihar and Orissa, and an Additional Member of the Council of the Lieutenant-Governor for making Laws and Regulations.
Reginald George Kilby, Indian Civil Service, Magistrate and Collector, Balasore, Bihar and Orissa.
Robert Egerton Purves, Public Works Department (retired), lately Chief Engineer and Secretary to Government, Punjab, Irrigation Branch.
Arthur Bradley Kettlewell, Indian Civil Service, Additional Secretary to Government, Punjab.
Raj Bahadur Lala Ram Saran Das, a Member of the Council of the Lieutenant-Governor, Punjab, for making Laws and Regulations.
Khan Bahadur Mian Muhammad Shafi, Barrister at-Law, Advocate of the Chief Court, Punjab, and a Member of the Council of the Governor-General for making Laws and Regulations.
Hugh Aylmer Thornton, Indian Civil Service, Superintendent, Northern. Shan States, Burma.
Charles Stewart Middleness , Superintendent, Geological Survey of India.
Major Frederick Norman White MD, Indian Medical Service, Assistant Director-General, Indian Medical Service (Sanitary).
John Loader Maffey, Indian Civil Service, Private Secretary to the Viceroy, and lately Deputy Secretary in the Foreign and Political Department, Government of India.
Diwan Bahadur Tiwari Chhajuram, Diwan of the Datia State, Central India.
Seth Chandumal Dhudha, of Bikaner, Rajputana.
Steuart Edmund Pears, Indian Civil Service, Political Agent, Khyber, North-West Frontier Province.
William Nawton Maw, Indian Civil Service, Deputy Commissioner of Jubbulpore, Central Provinces.
John Edward Webster, Indian Civil Service, Deputy Commissioner of Sylhet, Assam.

In recognition of services during the War:
Capt. Alexander Gillilan Johnson MacIlwaine, Royal Army Medical Corps, Embarkation Medical Officer, Bombay.
Col. Herbert Alexander Kaye Jennings, Royal Artillery, Director of Ordnance Stores in India.
Lt.-Col. Thomas George Peacocke, Army Remount Department, Superintendent, Remount Depot, Ahmednagar.
Major Edward William Crawfurd Ridgeway, 1st Battalion, 2nd King Edward's Own Gurkha Rifles (The Sirmoor Rifles), Recruiting Officer for Gurkhas.
Capt. Edwin James Mollison, 125th Napier's Rifles Recruiting Officer for Punjabi Musalmans.
Thomas Avery, Chief Constructor, Royal Indian Marine Dockyard, Bombay.
Commander Ernest Whiteside Huddleston, Royal Indian Marine, Senior Marine Transport Officer, Bombay.
Major Richard Alexander Steel, 17th Cavalry; Indian Army.
Lt.-Col. John Walter Beresford Merewether, Supernumerary List, Indian Army, Political Department, Bombay.

The Royal Victorian Order

Knight Grand Cross of the Royal Victorian Order (GCVO)
William Mansfield, Baron Sandhurst , Lord Chamberlain to His Majesty the King.

Knight Commander of the Royal Victorian Order (KCVO)
Sir Thomas Little Heath , Joint Permanent Secretary to the Treasury and Auditor of the Civil List.
Lt.-Col. Malcolm Donald Murray , (late Seaforth Highlanders), Comptroller to His Royal Highness the Duke of Connaught.
Col. Henry Streatfeild  (Grenadier Guards), Private Secretary to Her Majesty Queen Alexandra.
Edward William Wallington , Private Secretary to Her Majesty the Queen.

Commander of the Royal Victorian Order (CVO)
Paymaster-in-Chief John Henry George Chappie 
Walter Peacock , Secretary to the Duchy of Cornwall.

Member of the Royal Victorian Order, 4th class (MVO)
Capt. the Lord Claud Hamilton  (Grenadier Guards), attached to His Royal Highness the Prince of Wales.
Noel Dean Bardswell MD, Medical Superintendent, King Edward VII's Sanatorium, Midhurst, Sussex.
Frederick Stanley Hewett MD, Surgeon Apothecary to His Majesty the King.
Engineer Lieutenant-Commander Réné Charles Hugill , late His Majesty's Yacht Victoria and Albert.
Paymaster-in-chief Frederick William Mortimore, Royal Navy (retired), late His Majesty's Yacht Victoria and Albert.
Major Reginald Henry Seymour, King's Royal Rifle Corps.

Member of the Royal Victorian Order, 5th class (MVO)
Haywood Temple Holmes, Assistant Accountant to the Treasury.

Kaisar-i-Hind Medal
First Class
Her Highness The Maharani of Panna
Her Highness The Rani Sahiba Laxmibai Puar of Dhar, Central India
The Rev. William Skinner MA DD, Principal of the Christian College, Madras
Kate Graham, wife of Rev. J. A. Graham, of St. Andrew's Colonial Homes, Kalimpong, Bengal
Rani Surat Kaur Sahiba, Landholder of Khairagarh, Kheri, United Provinces.
Henry Martyn Newton , of the Church of Scotland Mission at Jalalpur Jattan, Gujrat, in the Punjab
Robert George Robson MA MD , Chairman of the Municipal Committee of Ajmer
Rev. Peter Cullen MD, Brig-Surgeon Lt.-Col. (retired) of Jubbulpore, Central Provinces.

Imperial Service Order (ISO)

Home Civil Service
Samuel Bozman, Deputy Principal of the Statistical Office Customs and Excise.
Francis Morgan Bryant , Secretary of His Majesty's Private Secretary's Office.
Mark Edwin Pescott Frost, Secretary to the Admiral. Superintendent, Portsmouth Dockyard.
George William Lloyd, First Class Clerk, Board of Agriculture and Fisheries.
Harry Archbutt Venables, Chief Examiner, Finance Department, War Office.
Clement von Berg, Chief Clerk, National Debt Office.

Colonial Civil Service
John Cullen, Commissioner of Police, Dominion of New Zealand.
Édouard Gaston Daniel Deville, Surveyor-General, Topographical Surveys, Dominion of Canada.
Frederick Joseph Glackmeyer, Sergeant-at-Arms of the Legislative Assembly of Ontario.
William Charles Macready, Assistant Postmaster-General, Island of Ceylon.
Joseph Henry Maiden, Director, Botanic Gardens and Government Botanist, State of New South Wales.
Commander John Frederick Mills , Harbour Master, Selangor.
Ressaldar Major Haji Musa Farah, lately Chief Native Assistant, Somaliland Protectorate.
George Ng Fuk-shang, Clerk and Accountant, Police Department, Colony of Hong Kong.
Edwin Mitchell Smith, Surveyor-General, State of South Australia.
George Blackstone Williams, Senior Magistrate, Cape Town, Union of South Africa.

Indian Civil Service
Frederick Talbot Eades, Senior Clerk, Store Department.
Charles Norman Hall , Superintendent, Decca Convict Gang, Jail Department, Bombay.
Parashuram Krishna Chitale LCE, Public Works Department, Bombay, Executive Engineer, Gujarat Irrigation District.
John Arthur Evans Burrup, Assistant Collector of Customs, Calcutta.
Khan Bahadur Rustomji Bamanji Vakil BA LLB, Senior Assistant Secretary, Revenue and Financial Departments, Bombay Government.
Edmund Burke DVM  Civil Veterinary Department, Professor of Surgery, Punjab Veterinary College, Lahore, Punjab.
Simon Mackertich Minus, Deputy Registrar of the Chief Court of Burma.
Khan Bahadur Sayyid Muhammad Mustafa, Deputy Collector and Special Manager of the Nanpara Estate, United Provinces.
Richard Henry Blaker, Registrar, Government of India, Education Department.
Maung Tun Nyein, Extra Assistant Commissioner and Government Translator, Burma.

Distinguished Service Order (DSO) 

Maj. William Maxwell Acton, Royal Irish Rifles
Maj. and Brevet Lt.-Col. Robert Berkeley Airey, Army Service Corps
Maj. John James Aitken, Army Veterinary Corps
Maj. James Whitelaw Alexander, West Yorkshire Regiment
Capt. Henry Malcolm Jerome Alves, Royal Artillery
Maj. Clifford Reginald Templeman Annesley, Army Service Corps
Maj. Charles Clement Armitage, Royal Artillery
Maj. Herbert Tollemache Arnold, Army Pay Dept
Maj. Herbert Vale Bagshawe, Royal Army Medical Corps
Maj. George Henry Barnett, King's Royal Rifle Corps
Maj. Basil Sorley Bartlett, Royal Army Medical Corps
Lt.-Col. John Samuel Jocelyn Baumgartner, East Lancashire Regiment
Maj. Arthur George Bayley, Oxfordshire and Buckinghamshire Light Infantry
Capt. William Mabisse Beckwith, late Coldstream Guards
Maj. (temp. Lt.-Col.) Bertram Langdon Beddy, Army Service Corps
Maj. Arthur Hugh Bell, Royal Engineers
Capt. Joseph Benskin, Royal Engineers
Maj. Henry Percy Frank Bicknell, Middlesex Regiment
Maj. Charles Henry Marion Bingham, Army Service Corps
Capt. Charles Cautley Blackburn, late Norfolk Regiment
Temp. Lt.-Col. Cyril Aubrey Blacklock, King's Royal Rifle Corps
Maj. Gerald Charles Gordon Blunt, Army Service Corps
Maj. Henry Griffith Boone, Royal Artillery
Maj. Thomas Macaulay Booth, Gordon Highlanders
Lt.-Col. Ernest Albert Bourke, Royal Army Medical Corps
Maj. John de Vere Bowles, Royal Artillery
Maj. Henry Alexander Boyd, Royal Artillery
Capt. The Hon. Roger Brand, Rifle Brigade
Maj. and Hon Lt.-Col. Arthur William Brewill, Nottinghamshire and Derbyshire Regiment
Lt.-Col. Eardley Wilmot Brooke, Army Service Corps
Maj. Percy Robert Bruce, Nottinghamshire Yeomanry
Capt. and Brevet Maj. George Bull, Royal Irish Fusiliers, Royal Irish Rifles
Capt. Eric de Burgh, 9th Hodson's Horse, Indian Army
Maj. William Burnett, North Staffordshire Regiment
Maj. Reginald Francis Amhurst Butterworth, Royal Engineers
Maj. Anthony Buxton, Essex Yeomanry
Maj. John Laurence Buxton, Rifle Brigade
Maj. Ernest Lawrence Caldecott, Royal Artillery
Maj. Keith Gordon Campbell, Royal Artillery, attached 26th Jacob's Mountain Battery, Indian Army
Maj. Norman St. Clair Campbell, Royal Artillery
Maj. Charles Murray Carpenter, Royal Engineers
Maj. Charles Ronald Brownlow Carrington, Royal Artillery
Maj. William Francis Challinor, Royal Field Artillery
Capt. Edward Tankerville Chamberlayne, Warwickshire Yeomanry
Capt. Clement Hope Rawdon Chesney, Royal Engineers
Lt.-Col. Sir Smith Hill Child , Royal Field Artillery
Capt. David Brynmor Chiles-Evans MB, Royal Army Medical Corps
Maj. Cecil Horace Clark, Royal Artillery
Maj. Harry Clissold, Royal Engineers
Maj. Louis William la Trobe Cockcraft, Royal Artillery
Maj. Jacob Waley Cohen, 16th Battalion, London Regiment
Capt. John Francis Stanhope Duke Coleridge, 8th Gurkha Rifles, Indian Army
Capt. Dudley Stuart Collins. Royal Engineers
Capt. Hamilton Stratford Collins, Shropshire Light Infantry
Maj. Robert John Collins, Royal Berkshire Regiment
Lt.-Col. Charles Sydney Collison, Middlesex Regiment, Royal Warwickshire Regiment
Maj. Gerald Conder, Army Veterinary Corps
Maj. and Brevet Lt.-Col. Bertram Hewett Hunter Cooke, Rifle Brigade
Maj. Harold Temple Cotton, South Lancashire Regiment
Surg.-Maj. Robert Macnamara Cowie, 1st Life Guards
Maj. Hugh Cracroft, Army Service Corps
Maj. Reginald Baskerville Jervis Crawfurd, Coldstream Guards
Maj. Edmund Fraser Creswell, Royal Artillery
Maj. Sydney D'Aguilar Crookshank , Royal Engineers
Maj. George William Kilner Crosland, late West Riding Regiment
Maj. Ernest Jackson Cummins, Royal Artillery
Temp. Maj. Thomas Latimer Cunningham, Cameron Highlanders
Capt. Cyril Samuel Sackville Curteis, Royal Artillery
Maj. Bertram William Young Danford, Royal Engineers
Capt. John Clive Darling, 20th Hussars
Maj. John May Darling MB , Royal Army Medical Corps
Lt.-Col. Samuel Davenport, Gloucestershire Regiment
Temp. Maj. Arthur Henry Davis, Army Service Corps
Maj. (temp. Lt.-Col.) Gronow John Davis, 22nd Punjabis, Indian Army, King's Royal Rifle Corps
Maj. Addis Delacombe, Army Pay Department
Maj. Harry Denison, Royal Artillery
Capt. (temp. Capt. Royal Engineers) Wilfrid Thomas Dodd, Royal Engineers
Maj. (temp. Lt.-Col.) William Drury Drury-Lowe, Capt, Royal Field Artillery
Maj. Joseph Cameron Dunbar, Royal Artillery
Maj. Kenneth Duncan, Royal Field Artillery
Capt. Frederick Eaves, Royal Lancaster Regiment
Lt.-Col. Archibald James Fergusson Eden, Oxfordshire and Buckinghamshire Light Infantry
Capt. Charles William Edwards, Army Service Corps
Maj. Hugh Jamieson Elles, Royal Engineers
Maj. Arthur Edward Erskine, Royal Artillery
Maj. Sir Thomas Wilfrid Hargreaves John Erskine , Cameron Highlanders
Maj. Arthur Erskine-Murray, Royal Artillery
Maj. Oscar Lewis Eugster, Honourable Artillery Company
Qrmr. and Hon. Maj. Arthur Edward Everingham, Royal Scots
Capt. Charles Ariel Evill, Monmouthshire Regiment
Maj. Frank Simeon Exham, Army Ordnance Depot
Maj. Charles Gordon Falcon, Royal Engineers
Maj. Philip Vernon le Geyt Falle, Army Service Corps
Maj. James Farquhar, Royal Artillery
Maj. Charles Farrant, Royal Army Medical Corps
Maj. Arthur Herbert Broom Faster, Royal Lancaster Regiment
Maj. Ralph Frankland Morris Fawcett, Royal Army Medical Corps
Maj. Timothy Fetherstonhaugh, Seaforth Highlanders
Capt. Charles Robert Lewis FitzGerald, 126th Baluchis, Indian Army
Capt. Horace John Flower, King's Royal Rifle Corps
Lt.-Col. Thomas Henderson Forrest MB, Royal Army Medical Corps
Maj. David Forster, Royal Engineers
Capt. and Brevet Maj. Victor Morven Fortune, Royal Highlanders
Maj. Alastair Norman Fraser MB, Royal Army Medical Corps
Maj. George Ireland Fraser, Cameron Highlanders
Maj. and Brevet Lt.-Col. Henry Francis Edward Freeland , Royal Engineers
Maj. and Brevet Lt.-Col. Gilbert Robertson Frith, Royal Engineers
Capt. Eric Dalrymple Gairdner MB, Royal Army Medical Corps
Lt.-Col. James Stuart Gallie, Royal Army Medical Corps
Temp. Maj. George Henry Gater, Nottinghamshire and Derbyshire Regiment
Maj. William Alexander Stewart Gemmell, Royal Horse Artillery
Capt. Thomas Gibbons, Essex Regiment
Capt. Edward Douglas Giles, 35th Scinde Horse, Indian Army
Maj. Alexander Inglis Robertson Glasfurd, 46th Punjabis, Indian Army
Maj. Alfred Edgar Glasgow, Royal Sussex Regiment
Maj. Harry Dundas Goldsmith, Duke of Cornwall's Light Infantry
Maj. Bertrand Gorges Reginald Gordon, Gordon Highlanders
Maj. Evelyn Boscawen Gordon, Northumberland Fusiliers
Temp. Lt.-Col. Edward Hyde Hamilton Gordon, Gordon Highlanders
Maj. Arthur Kenneth Grant, Royal West Kent Regiment
Maj. Dudley Harcourt Fleming Grant, Lincolnshire Regiment
Maj. Clive Osric Vere Gray, Seaforth Highlanders
Temp. Lt.-Col. John Anselm Samuel Gray, Special List
Lt.-Col. John Grech, Royal Army Medical Corps
Maj. Henry Clifford Rodes Green, King's Royal Rifle Corps
Maj. John Joseph Griffith , Army Veterinary Corps
Capt. Harold St. George Hamersley, Army Service Corps
Lt.-Col. Claud Lorn Campbell Hamilton, Royal Artillery
Capt. and Brevet Maj. James Melvill Hamilton, Gordon Highlanders
Maj. Robert Hamilton-Stubber, South Irish Horse, attached to 1st Life Guards
Maj. Reginald Chalmers Hammond, Royal Engineers
Maj. (temp. Lt.-Col.) Antony Ernest Wentworth Harman, 2nd Dragoon Guards, 18th Hussars
Maj. Herbert Roche Hayter, Army Service Corps
Maj. John Raph Hedley, Northumberland Fusiliers (Territorial Force), Border Regiment
Maj. Kenneth Henderson, 39th Garhwal Rifles, Indian Army
Maj. Patrick Hagart Henderson MB, Royal Army Medical Corps
Capt. and Brevet Maj. The Hon. Anthony Morton Henley, 5th Lancers
Maj. Louis William Herbert, South Lancashire Regiment
Maj. George Wykeham Heron, Royal Army Medical Corps
Capt. Alfred Herbert Heslop MB, Royal Army Medical Corps
Capt. The Hon. Evelyn James Hewitt, Dorsetshire Regiment
Maj. Cecil Percival Heywood, Coldstream Guards
Maj. Charles Lawrence Hickling, Royal Artillery
Maj. Walter Pitts Hendy Hill, Royal Fusiliers
Maj. Lionel Lennard Hoare, Army Ordnance Depot
Maj. Clarence John Hobkirk, Essex Regiment
Capt. John Rowland Hodgkins , Army Veterinary Corps
Temp. Maj. Frank Hodsoll, Army Service Corps
Maj. Philip Granville Hardinge Hogg, Royal Engineers
Maj. Arthur Ernest Holbrook, Army Service Corps
Maj. Edmund Locock Hughes, Northamptonshire Regiment
Maj. Thomas Edward Carew Hunt, Royal Berkshire Regiment
Maj. Charles Finlayson Hunter, 4th Dragoon Guards
Capt. George Staunton Husband MB, Indian Medical Service
Maj. Percy Leigh Ingpen, West Yorkshire Regiment
Maj. John O'Donnell Ingram, Gloucestershire Regiment
Capt. George Scott Jackson, Northumberland Fusiliers
Maj. Edmond James Jameson, Leinster Regiment
Maj. Edward Harvey Jarvis, Royal Inniskilling Fusiliers
Maj. Richard Vincent Jellicoe, late Royal Engineers
Capt. Leopold Christian Duncan Jenner, late King's Royal Rifle Corps
Maj. Francis Garven Dillon Johnston, Royal Field Artillery
Capt. Conrad Routh Jones, Army Ordnance Depot
Maj. William Allen Frere Jones, Royal Artillery
Temp. Major Philip Walter Jupe, Motor Machine Gun Service
Maj. Harold Swift Kaye, Yorkshire Light Infantry
Temp. Maj. Philip Travice Rubie Kellner, Royal Engineers
Capt. William Hyde Kelly, Royal Engineers
Maj. Henry Brewster Percy Lion Kennedy, King's Royal Rifle Corps, London Regiment
Capt. Roger John Brownlow Keyes , (Commodore, 2nd Class)
Maj. William Albert de Courcy King, Royal Engineers
Maj. and Brevet Lt.-Col. Walter Mervyn St. George Kirke, Royal Artillery
Temp. Maj. James George Kirkwood, Gloucestershire Regiment
Capt. Charles Edward Kitchin, South Wales Borderers
Capt. Charles Louis William Morley Knight, late Royal Artillery
Temp. Maj. James Leadbitter Knott, West Yorkshire Regiment
Maj. (temp. Lt.-Col.) Bertram John Lang, Argyll and Sutherland Highlanders
Maj. Owen Mortimer Lanyon, Royal Artillery
Capt. Frederick William Bernardine Law, South Staffordshire Regiment
Maj. Percy Gerald Parker Lea, Army Service Corps
Maj. Price Kinnear Lewes, Royal Artillery
Maj. Ernest Albert Lewis, Royal Engineers
Maj. David John Lidbury, Royal Engineers
Maj. Frederick Hamilton Lister, Royal Artillery
Capt. Frederick Shirley Litchfield-Speer 
Maj. Walter Francis Lucey, Royal Field Artillery
Capt. Colmer William Donald Lynch, Yorkshire Light Infantry
Maj. Claude Darey George Lyon, Royal Artillery
Maj. Arthur Gabell Macdonald, Royal Berkshire Regiment
Maj. Kenneth Lachlan MacDonald, 1st Lovat's Scouts, Yeomanry
Capt. Percy Wilfrid Machell , Border Regiment
Maj. and Brevet Lt.-Col. George Birnie Mackenzie, Royal Artillery
Lt.-Col. Ronald Campbell Maclachlan, Rifle Brigade
Maj. Meredith Magniac, Lancashire Fusiliers
Maj. Claud Archibald Scott Maitland, Gordon Highlanders
Maj. Hubert William Man, Army Ordnance Depot
Maj. Henry Seymour Marshall, Royal Artillery
Capt. Giffard Le Quesne Martel, Royal Engineers
Capt. Glyn Keith Murray Mason, 14th Hussars
Capt. and Brevet Maj. Seaton Dunham Massy, Royal Flying Corps, Indian Army
Lt.-Col. Walter Hudson Matthews, 19th Battalion, London Regiment
Maj. Edmund Joseph McAllister, Army Service Corps
Maj. Maurice Edwin McConaghey, Royal Scots Fusiliers
Capt. John Gerald McConaghy, 25th Cavalry, Indian Army
Lt.-Col. James Douglas McLachlan, Cameron Highlanders
Maj. Edmund Richard Meade-Waldo, Rifle Brigade
Maj. Philip Albert Meldon, Royal Artillery
Maj. Abel Mellor, Royal Artillery
Maj. George Feilden Menzies, Durham Light Infantry
Maj. Arthur Drummond Nairne Merriman, Royal Irish Rifles
Temp. Maj. Francis Edward Metcalfe, Lincolnshire Regiment
Maj. Archibald Henry Moberly, Royal Artillery
Temp. Lt.-Col. Edgar Monteagle-Browne, Royal Munster Fusiliers
Maj. Maxton Moore, Army Service Corps
Maj. George William Sterne Morris, Royal Field Artillery
Capt. James Archibald Morrison, Grenadier Guards
Capt. John Harold Mousley, Royal Engineers
Maj. Edward Newman Mozley, Royal Engineers
Lt.-Col. William Murray-Threipland, Welsh Guards
Temp. Maj. Edward Christopher Musgrave, King's Royal Rifle Corps
Capt. Sydney Frederick Muspratt, 12th Cavalry, Indian Army
Maj. and Brevet Lt.-Col. Ethelbert Monk Newell, Royal Engineers
Maj. (temp. Maj. Royal Engineers) Stanley Monk Newell, Royal Engineers
Capt. Henry Newton, Nottinghamshire and Derbyshire Regiment
Temp. Maj. Herbert Niblett, Army Service Corps
Maj. Walter Norris Nicholson, Suffolk Regiment
Maj. Oswald Carmichael Niven, Royal Artillery
Maj. James Arundel Nixon, Royal Lancaster Regiment
Maj. Edward Hubert Norman, Royal West Kent Regiment., London Regiment
Maj. Arthur Northen, Army Service Corps
Maj. Walter Vyvian Nugent, Royal Artillery
Capt. William Francis Dixon Nuttall, Royal Engineers
Qtr. and Hon. Maj. Timothy O'Shea, 9th Battalion, London Regiment
Maj. George Muir Oldham, Royal Engineers
Maj. Thomas Ormsby, Army Paymasters Department
Maj. Reginald Arthur Herbert Orpen-Palmer, Leinster Regiment
Maj. Arthur Carr Osburn, Royal Army Medical Corps
Maj. Sydney Lloyd Owen, Royal Engineers
Maj. William Vere Packe, Royal Field Artillery
Maj. Cuthbert Frederick Graham Page, Royal Artillery
Temp. Lt.-Col. Cecil Walter Paget, Royal Engineers
Temp. Maj. Hugh John Chevallier Peirs, Royal West Surrey Regiment
Capt. Hon. Dudley Roger Hugh Pelham, late 10th Hussars
Maj. and Brevet Lt.-Col. Charles Foskett Phipps, Royal Artillery
Maj. William Norman Pilkington, South Lancashire Regiment
Maj. Marcus John Barre de la Poer Beresford, South Wales Borderers
Maj. Herbert de Lisle Pollard-Lowsley , Royal Engineers
Capt. Sydney Buxton Pope, 58th Vaughan's Rifles, Indian Army
Maj. Claud Furniss Potter, Royal Artillery
Maj. Philip Lionel William Powell, Welsh Regiment
Maj. Robert Emile Shepherd Prentice, Highland Light Infantry
Temp. Maj. Harold Astley Somerset Prior, Yorkshire Regiment
Maj. Hon. Henry Cornelius O'Callaghan Prittie, Rifle Brigade
Maj. and Brevet Lt.-Col. Charles Bertie Prowse, Somerset Light Infantry
Capt. and Brevet Maj. John Henry Purvis, Highland Light Infantry
Maj. and Brevet Lt.-Col. Percy Pollexfen de Blaquiere Radcliffe, Royal Artillery
Maj. Hilton Alexander Ramsay, Royal Artillery
Maj. Robert Richmond Raymer, South Staffordshire Regiment
Maj. William Bryan Fleetwood Rayner, Royal Fusiliers
Capt. John Jeffrey Readman, 2nd Dragoons
Capt. William Knowles Rebsch, Supply and Transport Corps, Indian Army
Maj. Frederic James Reid, Army Service Corps
Maj. Edward Harrison Rigg, Yorkshire Light Infantry
Capt. Alexander Robertson, Royal Engineers
Maj. Hugh Stuart Rogers, Shropshire Light Infantry
Maj. Alexander Rolland, Royal Engineers
Capt. and Brevet Maj. Arthur Justin Ross, Royal Engineers and Royal Flying Corps
Maj. and Brevet Lt.-Col. Claude Russell-Brown, Royal Engineers
Maj. and Brevet Lt.-Col. Arthur Richard Careless Sanders, Royal Engineers
Maj. Patrick Barclay Sangster, 2nd Lancers, Indian Army
Maj. Henry Valentine Bache de Satge, Royal Field Artillery
Temp. Maj. Reginald George Francis Saunders, Army Service Corps
Maj. Guy Henry Sawyer, Royal Berkshire Regiment
Maj. William Ernest Scafe, Devonshire Regiment
Maj. Alfred George Scammell, Royal Field Artillery
Maj. John Creagh Scott, Argyll and Sutherland Highlanders
Lt.-Col. Evelyn Pierce Sewell MB, Royal Army Medical Corps
Maj. Lord Henry Charles Seymour, Grenadier Guards
Maj. William John Shannon, 16th Lancers
Maj. John Joseph Shute, Liverpool Regiment
Maj. John Norman Sinclair, Royal Artillery
Maj. Edward John Skinner, Royal Artillery
Capt. William Clayton Smales, Royal Army Medical Corps
Maj. George Alexander Smith, Gordon Highlanders (Territorial Force), Royal Lancaster Regiment
Maj. Harry Reginald Walter Marriott Smith, Royal Artillery
Maj. John Grant Smith, Seaforth Highlanders
Capt. Humphry Waugh Snow, late Royal West Kent Regiment
Capt. Maurice Eden Sowerby, Royal Engineers
Maj. William Moore Bell Sparkes, Royal Army Medical Corps
Maj. Leonard Kengon Stanbrough, Royal Artillery
Lt.-Col. Davison Bruce Stewart, Royal Artillery
Capt. Richard Edgar Sugden, West Riding Regiment
Maj. Frederick Sutton, Royal Artillery
Maj. Joseph Leonard Swainson, Duke of Cornwall's Light Infantry
Maj. Cuthbert Gambier Ryves Sydney-Turner, Army Service Corps
Capt. Maurice Grove Taylor, Royal Engineers
Maj. Arthur Cecil Temperley, Norfolk Regiment
Maj. Charles Bouverie Thackeray, Royal Artillery
Maj. Frederick Vivian Thompson, Royal Engineers
Maj. Charles Pinkerton Thomson MD, Royal Army Medical Corps
Maj. Noel Arbuthnot Thomson, Seaforth Highlanders
Maj. Roger Gordon Thomson, Royal Artillery
Lt. George Leslie Torrens, West India Regiment (employed with Lancashire Fusiliers)
Capt. Reginald Yorke Tyrwhitt , (Commodore, 1st Class)
Capt. John Percy Delabene Underwood, Loyal North Lancashire Regiment (attached to Nigeria Regiment)
Maj. Edward James Forrester Vaughan, Devonshire Regiment
Maj. Edward Gurth Wace, Royal Engineers
Maj. Hugh Godfrey Killigrew Wait, Royal Engineers
Capt. James Walker, East Riding of Yorkshire Yeomanry
Maj. Reginald Selby Walker, Royal Engineers
Temp. Lt.-Col. Hugh Robert Wallace, Suffolk Regiment, late Gordon Highlanders
Capt. Robert Jocelyn Rowan Waller, Royal Artillery (attached to Nigeria Regiment)
Maj. Ernest Arnold Wallinger, Royal Artillery
Maj. Cusack Walton, Royal Engineers
Temp. Lt.-Col. George Edward Wannell, West Riding Regiment
Maj. Hugh Valentine Warrender, London Regiment
Capt. Alfred Edward Webb-Johnson MB , Royal Army Medical Corps
Maj. Norman William Webber, Royal Engineers
Maj. (temp. Lt.-Col.) William Hermann Frank Weber, Royal Artillery
Capt. Joseph Harold Stops Westley, Yorkshire Regiment
Maj. Joseph Robert Wethered, Gloucestershire Regiment
Maj. Harold Fife Whinney, Royal Fusiliers
Lt.-Col. Geoffrey Herbert Anthony White, Royal Artillery
Capt. James Whitehead, 1st Brahmans, Indian Army
Maj. (temp. Lt.-Col.) John Tyson Wigan, Berkshire Yeomanry., late 13th Hussars
Capt. Robert Hugh Willan, King's Royal Rifle Corps (attached to Signal Service, Royal Engineers)
Maj. Robert Carlisle Williams, Royal Artillery
Capt. Montague Harry Sherwood Willis, Suffolk Regiment, attached to Nigeria Regiment
Maj. Patrick Hogarth Wilson, Royal Artillery, attached to Royal Field Artillery
Capt. and Brevet Maj. The Hon. Maurice Anthony Wingfield, Rifle Brigade
Maj. Louis John Wyatt, North Staffordshire Regiment, York and Lancaster Regiment
Lt.-Col. John Watkins Yardley, retired pay

Australian Imperial Force
Act Lt.-Commdr. Leighton Seymour Bracegirdle, Royal Australian Naval Bridging Train
Capt. Thomas Frederick Brown, Army Medical Corps
Maj. Charles Moreland Montague Dare, 14th Battalion
Capt. Ronald Douglas Campbell, Army Medical Corps
Maj. Richard Francis Fitzgerald, 20th Battalion
Maj. Frederick Howard Francis, Army Service Corps
Maj. Cecil Horace Granville, 1st Light Horse Regiment
Hon. Capt. Thomas Griffiths, Staff
Maj. Albert Armytage Holdsworth, Army Service Corps
Capt. Raymond Lionel Leane, 11th Battalion
Capt. Charles Augustus Littler, 12th Battalion
Maj. Frank William le Maistre, 5th Battalion
Maj. Eliazar Lazar Margolin, 16th Battalion
Maj. John Barr McLean, Army Medical Corps
Capt. Edmund Osborn Milne, Army Service Corps
Maj. Reginald John Albert Travers, 17th Battalion
Maj. Bertram Alexander Gordon Watts, Royal Australian Garrison Artillery
Maj. Evan Alexander Wisdom, Commonwealth Military Forces

Canadian Force
Maj. Agar Stuart Allan Masterton Adamson, Princess Patricia's Canadian Light Infantry
Lt.-Col. William Donald Allan, 3rd Infantry Battalion, 15th Divisional Signal Company
Maj. Reginald James Brook, 3rd Infantry Battalion
Lt.-Col. Raymond Brutinel, Canadian Motor Machine Gun Brigade
Lt.-Col. Victor Carl Buchanan, 13th Infantry Battalion
Maj. Alexander George Cameron, 13th Infantry Battalion
Maj. Alfred Cecil Critchley, Lord Strathcona's Horse
Maj. Malcolm Docherty, Lord Strathcona's Horse
Brevet Lt.-Col. James Harold Elmsley, Royal Canadian Dragoons
Maj. Elroyd Ford, 15th Divisional Signal Company
Maj. Donald Faville Branston Gray, Princess Patricia's Canadian Light Infantry
Maj. Leslie Earls Haines, 7th Infantry Battalion
Maj. Thomas Craik Irving, Canadian Engineers
Maj. Thomas Malcolm McAvity, 5th Canadian Infantry Brigade
Maj. James Edgar Mills, Royal Canadian Horse Artillery
Lt.-Col. Charles Hamilton Mitchell, Canadian Force
Maj. Thomas Sydney Morrisey, 13th Infantry Battalion
Lt.-Col. Coote Nesbitt Shanly, Canadian Army Pay Corps

New Zealand Imperial Force
Maj. William Semmers Austen, 1st Battalion, N.Z. Rifle Brigade
Maj. Henry Esau Avery, No. 1 Company, Divisional Train
Lt.-Col. Robert Renton Grigor, Otago Mounted Rifles Regiment
Maj. Herbert Clarence Hurst, Canterbury Mounted Rifles Regiment
Maj. George Augustus King, Staff Corps
Capt. Charles Guy Powles, Staff Corps
Maj. Ralph Wyman, Auckland Mounted Rifles Regiment

South African Defence Forces
Maj. James Mitchell Baker

Military Cross (MC)
Capt. H.R.H. Edward Albert Christian George Andrew Patrick David, Prince of Wales and Duke of Cornwall , Grenadier Guards
2nd Lt. Richard Oliver Ackerley, South Wales Borderers
Temp. Capt. Arthur de Bels Adam, Liverpool Regiment
Lt. Edward Sydney Royston Adams, Royal Engineers
Capt. Kenneth Morland Agnew, Royal Field Artillery
Lt. David Lyulph Gore Wolseley, Earl of Airlie, 10th Hussars
2nd Lt. Charles Fleming Aitken, Welsh Horse Yeomanry
Capt. Alexander Claud Allan, Cameron Highlanders
2nd Lt. David Bruce Allan, Royal Scots
Capt. George Wigram Dundas Allen, Liverpool Regiment, and Royal Flying Corps
Capt. John Frederick Whitacre Allen, East Kent Regiment
2nd Lt. Arthur John Allmand, Cheshire Regiment
Temp. Capt. Charles E. Amphlett, Motor Machine Gun Service
Lt. Keith Anderson, Royal Field Artillery
Lt. Patrick Campbell Anderson, Seaforth Highlanders
Temp. Lt. Stuart. Gordon Anderson, Royal Engineers
Lt. David Dick Anderson, East Yorkshire Regiment
Capt. Arthur Emilius David Anderson, King's Own Scottish Borderers
Temp. Lt. Goldie Fraser Anderson, Royal Engineers
Temp. 2nd Lt. William Anderson, Cameron Highlanders
Temp. 2nd Lt. Claude Outram Dalgairns Anderson, Motor Machine Gun Corps
2nd Lt. George Roddam Angus, Durham Light Infantry
Capt. Philip Noel Anstruther, Royal West Kent Regiment
Capt. Allan Cholmondeley Arnold, Middlesex Regiment
Rev. Harold Stanley Astbury, Army Chaplains' Department
Lt. Owen Dayott Atkinson, Royal Engineers
Capt. Gerald Aylmer, Supply and Transport Corps, Indian Army
2nd Lt. Philip Babington, Hampshire Regiment, and Royal Flying Corps
Capt. Robert John Halkett Baddeley, 15th Lancers, Indian Army
Capt. Charles Lane Bagnall, Durham Light Infantry
2nd Lt. Ernest Alfred Baker, Royal Sussex Regiment
2nd Lt. Francis Douglas Baker, Royal 1st Devonshire Yeomanry
Capt. Ernest Herbert Campbell Bald, late 15th Hussars
2nd Lt. Charles James Prior Ball, Royal Artillery
Temp. Lt. Charles Thomas Ball, Hampshire Regiment
Lt. Edward Nettleton Balme, Essex Regiment
Temp. 2nd Lt. Hubert Beaumont Balmforth, North Lancashire Regiment
Lt. Albert Methuen Bankier, Argyll and Sutherland Highlanders
Lt. Herbert Graham Barber, York and Lancaster Regiment
2nd Lt. Alfred Edmund Barlow, Manchester Regiment
Lt. Vincent Hope Barnard, 6th Dragoon Guards
Temp. Capt. Arthur Gordon Barry, Lancashire Fusiliers
2nd Lt. John Anderson Barstow, Argyll and Sutherland Highlanders
Lt. James Wilfred Battersby, Royal Field Artillery
2nd Lt. Fred Oscar Baxter, Indian Army
Qtr.-Mst. and Hon. Capt. Richard Thomas Baxter, Royal Munster Fusiliers
Qtr.-Mst. and Hon Lt. Francis John Bayman, Army Service Corps
Capt. (temp. Maj.) Beaumont Henry Beaumont-Checkland, Nottinghamshire and Derbyshire Regiment
Temp. Lt. Claude Waylen Bell, Intelligence Corps
2nd Lt. Pearson Bell, Welsh Regiment
2nd Lt. Douglas Herbert Bell, Cameron Highlanders
Temp. 2nd Lt. George Robert Bernard, Essex Regiment
Lt. Horatio Pettus Mackintosh Berney-Ficklin, Norfolk Regiment
Lt. Edward Fleetwood Berry, 1/9th Gurkha Rifles, Indian Army
Lt. Bryan Bertram Bellew, Royal Irish Rifles
2nd Lt. Lawrence Trounce Gregory Vernon Biden, Royal Warwickshire Regiment
2nd Lt. George Brown Bird, Royal Warwickshire Regiment
Temp. Capt. Benedict Birkbeck, Coldstream Guards, Machine Gun Company
Temp. Capt. Gurth Swinnerton Blandy MD, Royal Army Medical Corps
Lt. Jack Frederick Bligh, Royal Field Artillery
Capt. William Senhouse Blunt, Royal Engineers
2nd Lt. Hubert Cave Blyde, Berkshire Yeomanry
Qtr.-Mst. and Hon. Capt. Sydney Thomas Boast, South Lancashire Regiment
Lt. John Boast, South Lancashire Regiment
Temp. Capt. Myles Boddington, Shropshire Light Infantry
Capt. Ronald Victor Courtenay Bodley, King's Royal Rifle Corps
Capt. Alister Cheney Bolton, Royal Scots Fusiliers and Royal Flying Corps
2nd Lt. Geoffrey George Hargreaves Bolton, East Lancashire Regiment
Temp. Capt. Lawrence Owen Bosworth, Intelligence Corps
Temp. 2nd Lt. Alec Edward Boucher, Royal Warwickshire Regiment
2nd Lt. Frank Everard Boundy, Liverpool Regiment
Capt. Geoffrey Arthur Holme Bower, Middlesex Regiment
Temp. Capt. Ernest John Egerton Boys, Royal Garrison Artillery
2nd Lt. Henry Bracken, Royal West Kent Regiment
Lt. Samuel Glenholme Lennox Bradley, 16th Battalion, London Regiment
2nd Lt. Swinfen Bramley Moore, Army Service Corps
Capt. John Charles Brand, Coldstream Guards
Capt. William Adam Brechin MB, Royal Army Medical Corps
Temp. Capt. Alexander Bremner MB, Royal Army Medical Corps
Capt. Athelstan Dermot St. George Bremner, Royal Engineers
Temp. 2nd Lt. Harold Sidney Bright, Special List
Temp. 2nd Lt. John Broadwood, Royal Scots
2nd Lt. John Gleave Brocklehurst, Army Service Corps
Lt. Arthur William Brocks, Worcestershire Regiment
2nd Lt. Ian Ashley Moreton Brodie of Brodie , Lovat's Scouts Yeomanry
Lt. Sir Basil Stanlake Brooke , 10th Hussars
Temp. Capt. Roderick St. Clair Brooke, Yorkshire Light Infantry
Battery Sgt.-Maj. George Ernest Brooks, Royal Horse Artillery
Sgt.-Maj. Robert Brown, Royal West Kent Regiment
Lt. Robert Weston Brooke, Yorkshire Dragoons
Temp. 2nd Lt. Douglas Fraser Bruce, Rifle Brigade
Capt. Harold Kendal Walpole Bruce, 2/2nd Gurkha Rifles, Indian Army
Capt. Lewis Campbell Bruce MD , Royal Army Medical Corps
Temp. Capt. Basil George Bryant, Durham Light Infantry
Temp. Capt. Angus Buchanan, South Wales Borderers
Temp. Capt. Anthony Stuart Buckland-Cockell, Special List
Temp. Capt. John Buckley, General List
Capt. Francis William Bullock-Marsham, 19th Hussars
2nd Lt. John Crocker Bulteel, Buckinghamshire Yeomanry
Temp. Capt. Arthur Burtenshaw, Army Service Corps
Lt. Henry Lionel Granville Burlton, Royal Field Artillery
Lt. Hugh Henry Burn, Coldstream Guards
Temp. 2nd Lt. Edward Burney, Intelligence Corps
Capt. Walter Egerton George Lucian, Viscount Bury, Scots Guards
Temp. Capt. William Harold Butler, Royal Army Medical Corps
Capt. Bernard Maurice Gardner Butterworth, Royal Garrison Artillery
Temp. 2nd Lt. Charles Henry Calvert, Royal Artillery
2nd Lt. John William Ronald Campbell, Worcestershire Regiment
2nd Lt. Ronald Carlisle, Welsh Horse Yeomanry
Temp. Capt. Graham Carr, Motor Machine Gun Service
2nd Lt. Harry William Carritt, Northamptonshire Regiment
Lt. Eric Carus-Wilson, Royal Engineers
Capt. John Newman Cash, Royal Engineers
Capt. Cyril Francis Cattley, East Kent Regiment
Rev. Charles Egerton Chadwick MA, Army Chaplains' Department
Capt. Norman Bairstow Chaffers, West Riding Regiment
Temp. Capt. Robert Challoner, Loyal North Lancashire Regiment
Capt. Noel Richard Lucas Chance, Royal Field Artillery
2nd Lt. Anthony James Bagot Chester, Indian Army
2nd Lt. Arthur Henry Talbot Chetwynd, Derby Yeomanry
Capt. Thomas Ford Chipp, Middlesex Regiment
Capt. John Eric Chippindall, Royal Engineers
Lt. Lord George Hugo Cholmondeley, Nottinghamshire Battery, Royal Horse Artillery
Capt. Malcolm Grahame Christie, Royal Flying Corps
2nd Lt. Charles Clark, Royal Artillery
Temp. Capt. Charles Willoughby Clark, Motor Machine Gun Service
Temp. Capt. Hubert William Clarke, Royal Monmouthshire Royal Engineers
Temp. Lt. Robert Hunter Clarkson, Royal Artillery
Capt. Robert Clough, West Yorkshire Regiment
2nd Lt. John Middleton Clyne, 17th Battalion, London Regiment
Capt. Cecil Percy Coates, Royal Monmouthshire Royal Engineers
Sgt.-Maj. Benjamin Collard, Welsh Regiment
Temp. 2nd Lt. Charles Ellis Merriam Coubrough, West Riding Regiment
Capt. Alfred Evelyn Coningham, Royal Engineers
Qtr.-Mst. and Hon. Maj. Michael Henry Connery, Manchester Regiment
Temp. 2nd Lt. Edward Denis Conran, Royal Munster Fusiliers
Capt. John Josias Conybeare, late Oxfordshire and Buckinghamshire Light Infantry
Temp. 2nd Lt. Reginald Charles Cooke, Welsh Regiment
Temp. 2nd Lt. William Vernon Cook, Gloucestershire Regiment
Sgt.-Maj. Walter John Cook, Coldstream Guards
Lt. James Percy Carre Cooper, Royal Flying Corps
Temp. Lt. Isaac Whitla Corkey MB, Royal Army Medical Corps
2nd Lt. Noel Robert Charles Cosby, Indian Army
Capt. Harold John Couchman, Royal Engineers
Qtr.-Mst. and Hon Lt. Frederick Cox, Lancashire Fusiliers
Lt. Eustace Richard Alan Calthrop Cox, Devonshire Regiment
Capt. Hugh Courtenay, Bedfordshire Regiment
Rev. Herbert Butler Cowl, Army Chaplains' Department
Lt. Hugh Crail, Army Service Corps
Temp. Lt. Harry William Hay Creasy, Essex Regiment
Capt. John Durnford Crosthwaite, 1/1st Battalion, London Regiment
Lt. Robert Danson Cunningham, Liverpool Regiment
2nd Lt. Robert Cocks Cunningham, Royal Highlanders
Sgt.-Maj. James Theodore le Page Cuthbertson, Royal Anglesey Royal Engineers
Lt. Albert Edward Harry Meyer Archibald, Lord Dalmeny, Grenadier Guards
Capt. Denis Daly, Royal Artillery
2nd Lt. George Murray Dammers, Dorset Yeomanry
2nd Lt. Alexander Gifford Davidson, Liverpool Regiment
Temp. Capt. Arthur Mostyn Davies, Special List
Temp. Capt. Edward Theophilus Davis, Army Cyclist Corps
Capt. John Nathael de la Perrelle, Royal Fusiliers
Capt. Joseph Leslie Dent , South Staffordshire Regiment
Temp. Lt. Robert George de Quetteville, Yorkshire Regiment
Temp. Lt. Harold Ernest Dewar, Cheshire Regiment
Jemadar Dhanlal Gurung, 1/5th Gurkha Rifles, Indian Army
Lt. John Herbert Dickinson, South Lancashire Regiment
Capt. Wadham Heathcote Diggle, Grenadier Guards
Capt. William Robert Douglas MB, Royal Army Medical Corps
Temp. Lt. Adolphe Drey, Army Service Corps
Capt. Kenneth Kirkpatrick Drury MB, Royal Army Medical Corps
Capt. Guy Rattray Dubs, King's Royal Rifle Corps
Temp. Capt. Christopher Robson Dudgeon, Royal Army Medical Corps
Capt. James Gordon Dugdale , Staff
Capt. Henry John Duncan, Liverpool Regiment
Temp. Lt. John Gordon Dutton, Royal Field Artillery
Regt. Q.M.S. Patrick Henry Dwane, Lincolnshire Regiment
Capt. George Eldridge Dyas, Royal Army Medical Corps
Capt. Sir John Swinnerton Dyer , Scots Guards
2nd Lt. Sidney Edwin Earnshaw, Royal Field Artillery, Territorial Force
2nd Lt. John Dennison Eccles, 9th Battalion, London Regiment
Temp. Capt. Alfred Cecil Edwards MB, Royal Army Medical Corps
Temp. Lt. Donald William Edwards, Army Service Corps
Temp. Lt. Owen Macaulay Eicke, Royal Field Artillery
2nd Lt. Russell George Elliott, York and Lancaster Regiment
Capt. Joseph Vernon Jenner Ellis, Royal Artillery
Temp. Lt. Richard England, Suffolk Regiment
Temp. 2nd Lt. Ivor Thomas Evans, South Wales Borderers
Lt. James John Pugh Evans, Welsh Guards
Capt. Thomas John Carey Evans , Indian Medical Service
The Rev. William Ewing MA, Army Chaplains' Department
2nd Lt. John Benbow Faber, Royal Engineers
Lt. Eric Gerard Fanning, Bedfordshire Regiment
Capt. Edward Lionel Farley, Royal Engineers
Capt. Cyril Farmer, Royal Garrison Artillery
Capt. Jacob Frederick Farrow, Royal Army Medical Corps
Capt. Richard Alexander Fawcett, West Yorkshire Regiment
Temp. Lt. Basil Ziani de Ferranti, Royal Garrison Artillery
Temp. Lt. James Lloyd Findlay, East Surrey Regiment
2nd Lt. William Morton Buller Feilden, Derby Yeomanry
Sgt.-Maj. Michael Flavin, Welsh Regiment
Temp. Lt. George Douglas Alexander Fletcher, Highland Light Infantry
Capt. Gordon Flemming, Gordon Highlanders
Temp. Lt. Maxwell Hunter Forsyth, Gordon Highlanders
Qtr.-Mst. and Hon. Capt. William Fowler, Royal Highlanders
2nd Lt. Harry Franklin, Manchester Regiment
Capt. Harold Edmund Franklyn, Yorkshire Regiment
Temp. Capt. Simon Keith Fraser, Seaforth Highlanders
Capt. Alexander Donald Fraser MB, Royal Army Medical Corps
Temp. Capt. Thomas Frederick, Norfolk Regiment
Capt. Reginald Charles Freer, Royal Field Artillery
Capt. William Henry Fry, Royal Garrison Artillery
Lt. Francis Periam Fuller-Acland-Hood, Coldstream Guards
2nd Lt. Albert Furley, Gloucestershire Regiment
Capt. Edward Keith Byrne Furze, Royal West Surrey Regiment
2nd Lt. John Fyfe, Scottish Rifles
Temp. Lt. Charles Thomas Galbraith MB, Royal Army Medical Corps
Capt. Lawrence Gall, 25th Cavalry, Indian Army
Capt. Michael Denman Gambier-Parry, Royal Welsh Fusiliers
The Rev. Ernest Arthur Gardner, Army Chaplains' Department
Staff Sgt.-Maj. Cecil Garside, Army Service Corps
Lt. Alfred Joseph Gatt, Royal Malta Artillery
2nd Lt. Herbert Valentine Geary, 69th Punjabis
Capt. Kenneth Francis Drake Gattie, Monmouthshire Regiment
Temp. Capt. Cyril Gentry-Birch, Royal Berkshire Regiment
2nd Lt. Charles Osborne Provis Gibson, Northumberland Fusiliers
Temp. Capt. Harry Gilbert, York and Lancaster Regiment
Rev. Henry Vincent Gill, Army Chaplains' Department
Lt. William Gillespie, Argyll and Sutherland Highlanders
Capt. John Gilmour MB , Royal Army Medical Corps
Temp. Capt. George Bruce Gilroy, Royal Highlanders
Temp. 2nd Lt. Arthur Louis Phillip Girdler, Royal Fusiliers
Temp. 2nd Lt. Albert Gittins, Shropshire Light Infantry
Capt. Reginald George Stanier Gordon, Dorset Yeo
Lt. Edward John Grinling, Lincolnshire Regiment
Lt. Reginald Thomas B. Glasspool, Durham Light Infantry
Temp. Capt. Archibald Glen, Royal Anglesey Royal Engineers
Capt. Alfred Reade Godwin-Austen, South Wales Borderers
Lt. William Golding, Royal Field Artillery
Capt. Henry Wetherall Goldney, Royal Garrison Artillery
2nd Lt. St. Barbe Goldsmith, Devonshire Regiment
2nd Lt. George Leonard Goodes, 4th Battalion, London Regiment
2nd Lt. Frank Edward Goodrich, Royal Flying Corps
Capt. Percival James Gout, 94th Russell's Infantry, Indian Army
2nd Lt. Arthur Ernest Gould, Royal Engineers
Capt. Stephen Gordon, Indian Medical Service
Temp. Lt. Frank Newbery Gossling, Postal Service, Royal Engineers
Temp. 2nd Lt. Clarence Edward Victor Graham, Royal Artillery
Capt. George Reginald Grant MB, Royal Army Medical Corps
Temp. 2nd Lt. Alexander Allen Gray, Durham Light Infantry
Temp. Capt. Gabriel Green, Essex Regiment
Capt. Charles James Salkeld Green, 7th Battalion, London Regiment
2nd Lt. Leysters Llewellyn Greener, Royal Warwickshire Regiment
2nd Lt. John Blackwood Greenshields, Royal Scots
Capt. Victor John Greenwood, 10th Hussars
Lt. Guy Saxon Llewellyn Gregson-Ellis, Royal Berkshire Regiment
Capt. Frank Baker Gresham, Army Veterinary Corps
Temp. Capt. Ernest Richard Gordon Greville, Royal Army Medical Corps
Temp. Lt. Charles Grice Grice-Hutchison, South Staffordshire Regiment
Lt. George Wilfred Grossmith, Leicestershire Regiment
Temp. Capt. Thomas Edwin Gullick, Army Service Corps
Temp. Lt. Francis Donald Gurrey, Royal Engineers
Lt. Robert Henry Hadow, Argyll and Sutherland Highlanders
Temp. Lt. Peyton Sheldon Hadley, Northamptonshire Regiment
Temp. 2nd Lt. Clarence Espeut Lyon Hall, South Wales Borderers
Lt. Philip Hamond , Motor Machine Gun Service
2nd Lt. Malcolm Ernest Hancock, Northamptonshire Regiment
2nd Lt. (temp. Capt. Royal Engineers) Harry Hannay, King's Own Scottish Borderers
Capt. Frank Stephen Hanson, Royal Warwickshire Regiment
Capt. Patrick Robert Hardinge, Scottish Rifles
2nd Lt. James Lonsdale Harris, Royal Engineers
Lt. William Lawson Harris, Royal Scots Fusiliers
2nd Lt. George Pickup Hartley. Royal Field Artillery
Temp. Lt. Leslie Morison Harvey, Royal Field Artillery
2nd Lt. George Henry Havelock-Sutton, 1st King Edward's Horse
Lt. Tyrrel Mann Hawker, Royal Field Artillery
Qtr.-Mst. and Hon Lt. Victor Thomas Alexander Hayden, Dorsetshire Regiment
Lt. Sidney John Heath, East Lancashire Regiment
Temp. 2nd Lt. Martin Arthur Heathcote, Royal Fusiliers
Lt. Henry Eric Hebbert, Royal Engineers
2nd Lt. William Herbert Hedges, Royal Engineers
Capt. Albert Norman Henderson, Royal Warwickshire Regiment
2nd Lt. Lionel Denham Henderson, Seaforth Highlanders
2nd Lt. Arthur Montagu Hepworth, Royal West Surrey Regiment
2nd Lt. Justin Howard Herring, Royal Flying Corps
Rev. John Hessenauer, Army Chaplains' Department
Temp. Capt. Walter Philip Hewetson, Royal Berkshire Regiment
Temp. 2nd Lt. James Edmund Hibbert, South Lancashire Regiment
Capt. Lancelot Daryl Hickes, Royal Artillery
Capt. William Thompson Highet, Royal Field Artillery
Lt. Edward Lawrence Higgins, 1/1st London Regiment
Capt. Laurence Hugh Higgon, Royal Garrison Artillery
Temp. Lt. Victor Cadifor Hilditch, Royal Field Artillery
Capt. Jacobus Darrell Hill, Scottish Rifles
Lt. Murray Victor Burrow Hill, Royal Fusiliers
Lt. Richard Hilton, Royal Artillery
Capt. (temp. Maj.) Lawrence Arthur Hind, Nottinghamshire and Derbyshire Regiment
Temp. Lt. John Hislop, Bedfordshire Regiment
Capt. Edward Norman Fortescue Hitchins, West Riding Regiment
Lt. Evelyn Hobson, Royal Anglesey Royal Engineers
Lt. Edward Holland, Worcestershire Yeomanry
Lt. William Honey, Royal Garrison Artillery
Temp. Qtr.-Mst. and Hon Lt. Charles Kittmer Honeywill, Royal Engineers
Temp. 2nd Lt. John Hornby, South Lancashire Regiment
2nd Lt. Edward Horsfall, Manchester Regiment
Temp. Capt. Frederick Elliott Hotblack, Intelligence Corps
Qtr.-Mst. and Hon Lt. Charles Frederick Houston, Royal Army Medical Corps
Temp. Capt. John Alderney Howell, Cheshire Regiment
Temp. Lt. John Baldwin Hoyle, South Lancashire Regiment
Capt. Thomas O'Brien Hubbard, Royal Flying Corps
 Temp. Capt. Herbert Henry Hudson, West Yorkshire Regiment
Capt. Charles Frederic Watson Hughes, 15th Sikhs, Indian Army
Capt. Edward William Hughes, 6th Battalion, London Regiment
Capt. Ernest Adolph Humphries, Worcestershire Regiment
Temp. Capt. Edgar Lafayette Hunter, Northamptonshire Regiment
Temp. Capt. Andrew Guy Hutcheson, Scottish Rifles
2nd Lt. Lawrence George David Hutchison, Liverpool Regiment
Lt. Harold Alfred Ivatt, South Staffordshire Regiment
Capt. Alan Izat, Royal Engineers
Capt. Archibald Hardie Knowles Jackson, Royal Warwickshire Regiment
Temp. Capt. Thomas Leslie Jackson, Cheshire Regiment
2nd Lt. (temp. Lt. Royal Engineers) William Francis Jackson, Royal Engineers
Temp. Capt. Percy Lewis Jackson, Machine-gun Corps
Temp. Lt. John Barclay Jaques, Durham Light Infantry
Temp. 2nd Lt. Dmitri Jarintzoff, East Lancashire Regiment
2nd Lt. Sydney Ralph Jenkins, Royal Engineers
Capt. Leoline Jenkins, Royal Garrison Artillery, and Royal Flying Corps
Temp. Capt. Harold Johnson, Liverpool Regiment
Sgt.-Maj. (now 2nd Lt) Ernest Johnson, Leicestershire Regiment
Temp. 2nd Lt. Robert Graham Johnston, Seaforth Highlanders
Lt. Hugh Liddon Johnston, 1/5th Battalion, London Regiment
Temp. Capt. Arthur Cotton Jones, Lincolnshire Regiment
Qtr.-Mst. and Hon. Capt. Thomas Albert Jones, Royal Sussex Regiment
2nd Lt. Leslie Tiel Jordan, Royal Engineers
Lt. Ralph Juckes, Royal Engineers
Capt. Edward Cotton Jury, 18th Hussars
Temp. Capt. Arthur Corrie Keep MD, Royal Army Medical Corps
Sgt.-Maj. Fred Cliffe Keightley, Lincolnshire Regiment
2nd Lt. John Philip Kellett, 2nd Battalion, London Regiment
Lt. Robert Harold Alexander Kellie, Royal Garrison Artillery
Rev. James Maurus Kelly, Army Chaplains' Department
Lt. Thomas Aloysius Kelly, 24th Battalion, London Regiment
Lt. Hugh Ainsworth Kelsall, Army Service Corps
Temp. Lt. Frederick Hawke Kemp, Postal Section, Royal Engineers
Capt. Martin Kemp-Welch, Royal West Surrey Regiment
Temp. Capt. Alexander John Kendrew MB, Royal Army Medical Corps
2nd Lt. Philip Percy Kenyon-Slaney, Royal North Devon Yeomanry
The Rev. Edwin Thomas Kerby MA, Army Chaplains' Department
Capt. Edward Rigby Kewley, Rifle Brigade
2nd Lt. Gilbert Kilner, Suffolk Regiment, Territorial Force
2nd Lt. Miles Henry King, West Riding Regiment
Capt. Andrew de Portal Kingsmill, Grenadier Guards
Lt. Philip Kirkup, Durham Light Infantry
Temp. Capt. Francis John Dobree Knowling, Argyll and Sutherland Highlanders
The Rev. Frederick Farence Komlosy, Army Chaplains' Department
Temp. 2nd Lt. Charles McMinamen Laing, Royal Scots Fusiliers
Temp. Lt. David Ernest Laing, Royal Engineers
Temp. Capt. Malcolm Henry Mortimer Lamb, Special List
2nd Lt. Du Pre Porcher Lance, Army Service Corps
Lt. Guy de Laval Landon, Royal Field Artillery
Temp. 2nd Lt. James Cecil Herbert Lane, Royal Field Artillery
Lt. Arthur Gace Langley, Royal Engineers
Capt. Arthur Wynton Langley, Royal Garrison Artillery
2nd Lt. Frederick Oswald Langley, South Staffordshire Regiment
Temp. 2nd Lt. Henry Clinton Laslett, Royal Field Artillery
Capt. Ronald John Ranulph Leacroft, Somerset Light Infantry
Lt. Hugh Henry Lean, Highland Light Infantry
Lt. Leonard Wright Learmount, Royal Flying Corps
Temp. Capt. Charles Barclay Leathem, King's Own Yorkshire Light Infantry
2nd Lt. George James Leathem, Middlesex Regiment
2nd Lt. Alec Wilfred Lee, South Staffordshire Regiment
The Rev. Edmund Legros, Army Chaplains' Department
2nd Lt. Walter Alexander Leith, Northumberland Hussars
Lt. John Leslie, 12th Lancers
Capt. Robert Burton Leslie, Lincolnshire Regiment
Lt. Reginald Lewis, Royal Berkshire Regiment
Temp. Lt. Ben Lightfoot, General List
Temp. Lt. Gordon Lindley, East Kent Regiment
2nd Lt. Robert Chaloner Lindsey-Brabazon, Welsh Regiment
Capt. Christopher George Ling, Royal Engineers
Lt. William Bradshaw Litherland, Nottinghamshire and Derbyshire Regiment
2nd Lt. David Gane Little, Worcestershire Regiment
Temp. 2nd Lt. Brian Llewellyn, Royal Engineers
Lt. Leslie Shipp Lloyd, 18th Hussars
Lt. William Loftus, Royal Scots
Temp. Lt. John Longbourne, Royal Field Artillery
Temp. 2nd Lt. Thomas Wilkes Lonsdale, Duke of Cornwall's Light Infantry
Capt. Clement Lovell MD, Royal Army Medical Corps
Capt. Henry Charles Lowry-Corry, Royal Field Artillery
Capt. John George Lowther, 11th Hussars
2nd Lt. Victor Carrington Lucas, Royal Field Artillery
Temp. Capt. Malcolm Angus MacDonald MB, Royal Army Medical Corps
Temp. Lt. Donald McCallum, Special List
Temp. Lt. John Sangster McCallam MD, Royal Army Medical Corps
Capt. Frank Alexander McCammon MB, Royal Army Medical Corps
Capt. John Dillon MacCormack, Royal Army Medical Corps
Lt. Robert McCreary, Royal Engineers
Lt. Basil Charles McEwen, Royal Flying Corps
Temp. Lt. Peter McGibbon MB, Royal Army Medical Corps
2nd Lt. Amyas MacGregor, Royal Engineers
2nd Lt. Alexander Cameron Mclntyre, Argyll and Sutherland Highlanders
2nd Lt. James Alastair Culbard Mackay, Seaforth Highlanders
Capt. Walter John Easton McKenzie, Army Veterinary Corps
Capt. Thomas Gordon Mackenzie, King's Own Yorkshire Light Infantry
Lt. William Drummond Mackintosh, Royal Engineers
Temp. Qrmr. and Hon Lt. John McLundie, Army Service Corps
Capt. Willie McMaster, Royal Field Artillery
Lt. Hugh Arthur McMullen, Royal Irish Fusiliers
Capt. Alan Gordon McNeill, Royal Engineers
Lt. Hugh John Macnamara, Royal Engineers
2nd Lt. Philip Albert Charles Maginn, 18th Battalion, London Regiment
Lt. John Wilfrid Douglas Mallins, Royal Engineers
Temp. Capt. Alexander William Ray Mallinson, Army Service Corps
Temp. Lt. Stuart Sidney Mallinson, Army Service Corps
Temp. Capt. Harry Ainsley Mann, Postal Section, Royal Engineers
Capt. Alan Frederick Marchment, 1/1st London Regiment
Hon. Capt. Edwin Charles Marfleet, Army Ordnance Depot
Lt. Philip Reginald Margetson, Royal Scots Fusiliers
Lt. John Charles Oakes Marriott, Northamptonshire Regiment
Capt. John Rudolph Marry, Royal Engineers
Lt. Stephen Gilbert Bowyer Marsh, Royal Field Artillery
Lt. Phillip Everard Graham Marsh, Army Service Corps
Capt. Charles Frederick Kelk Marshall, Royal Field Artillery
Lt. Alfred Russel Marshall, Royal Engineers
Staff Sgt.-Maj. Samuel Martin, Army Pay Corps
Lt. William Charles Maskell, Royal Field Artillery
Temp. Capt. Charles Lyall Mason, Royal Engineers
Capt. Hugh Royds Stokes Massy, Royal Artillery
Temp. Lt. Ernest Matthews, Royal Engineers
Temp. Lt. Ronald Vincent Maudslay, Royal Field Artillery
Temp. Lt. John Kindersley Maurice, Army Service Corps
Temp. Capt. John Maxwell, Rifle Brigade
Lt. Power MacMurrough Maxwell, Royal Artillery
2nd Lt. Henry William Mends May, Hampshire Regiment
2nd Lt. William Ernest Hopkins Metcalfe, Royal Field Artillery
2nd Lt. Booker Milburri, Hertfordshire Regiment
Capt. Herbert Stewart Milne MD, Royal Army Medical Corps
Temp. Lt. Ernest Charles Temple Minet, Royal Fusiliers
Capt. Cuthbert Elliott Montgomery, Army Service Corps
Capt. Alfred Garnet Moore, Manchester Regiment, attached to Royal Flying Corps
Capt. Harold Edward Moore, Royal Monmouthshire Royal Engineers
Temp. Capt. Humphrey Bateman Moore, Rifle Brigade
2nd Lt. John Rushton Moore, Cheshire Regiment
Temp. Capt. Harold Mead Moore, Army Service Corps
Lt. Bruce Samuel Kirkman Guise Moores, Royal Garrison Artillery
Sgt.-Maj. James Thomas Moraghan, Connaught Rangers
Lt. John Wayne Morgan, Royal Engineers
Qtr.-Mst. and Hon. Capt. William Albert Morris, Royal Inniskilling Fusiliers
Temp. Lt. Frederick Oscar Morris, Intelligence Corps
Lt. Desmond John Falkiner Morton, Royal Field Artillery
Sgt.-Maj. Harry Morton, Nottinghamshire and Derbyshire Regiment
2nd Lt. Hugh Fenwick Mott, 16th Battalion, London Regiment
Lt. James Bernard Mowat, Royal Engineers
2nd Lt. Stanley Mugford, 1st Scottish Horse Yeomanry
2nd Lt. James Ingram Muirhead, King's Own Yorkshire Light Infantry
Lt. (temp. Capt. Royal Engineers) John Spencer Muirhead
Lt. Frank Richard Mumford, Wiltshire Regiment
Sgt.-Maj. Thomas Murden, East Surrey Regiment
Capt. Cyril Francis de Sales Murphy, Royal Berkshire Regiment and Royal Flying Corps
2nd Lt. Henry Stoney Netherwood, West Riding Regiment
Lt. (temp. Capt) Alfred Geoffrey Neville, Royal Horse Artillery
Qtr.-Mst. and Hon Lt. Robert Patrick Neville, Northumberland Fusiliers
Temp. Lt. James Wilfrid Trevor Newbery, Royal Field Artillery
2nd Lt. Arthur Newman, Essex Regiment
Temp. Lt. Cecil Arnold Vessey Newsome, Durham Light Infantry
Temp. Capt. Philip Bouverie Bowyer Nichols, Suffolk Regiment
2nd Lt. Humphrey Brunei Noble, Northumberland Hussars Yeomanry
Temp. Capt. Herbert Luxton Norman, East Lancashire Regiment
Temp. Lt. Cyril Burton North, Royal Engineers
Temp. Capt. Walter Charles Norton, Royal Sussex Regiment
2nd Lt. Henry Hartley Noton, Lancashire Fusiliers
Temp. Lt. Richard Narcissus Nunn, Royal Lancaster Regiment
Temp. Lt. Joseph White O'Brien MB, Royal Army Medical Corps
Lt. Arthur Cathal O'Connor, Norfolk Regiment
Temp. Capt. John William Oldfield, General List
Capt. Edwin Herbert O'Reilly-Blackwood, Royal Garrison Artillery
Temp. Capt. Hugh James Orr-Ewing MB, Royal Army Medical Corps
Lt. Walter Llewellyn Owen, Liverpool Regiment
Capt. William Evelyn Pain, Royal Engineers
Lt. William Henry Palmer, King's Royal Rifle Corps
Capt. Henry Forbes Panton MB, Royal Army Medical Corps
The Rev. Arthur Groom Parham, Army Chaplains' Department
Capt. Adam St. John Lloyd Park, Royal Field Artillery
Temp. 2nd Lt. Charles Enverdale Park, General List, attached to Royal Engineers
Temp. 2nd Lt. Sidney John Parr, attached to 1st Dragoons
Capt. Isaac Arthur James Pask, Royal Garrison Artillery
Temp. 2nd Lt. George Hedworth Pattinson, Royal Fusiliers
Lt. Lawrence Arthur Pattinson, Royal Fusiliers and Royal Flying Corps
Temp. Capt. Noel Gervis Pearson, Nottinghamshire and Derbyshire Regiment
2nd Lt. Eric Alexander Pearson, King's Royal Rifle Corps
The Hon. Dudley Roger Hugh Pelham, late 10th Hussars
Lt. Hon. Sackville George Pelham, 11th Hussars
Temp. Capt. William Arthur Trevelyan Pennant, Royal Engineers
2nd Lt. Geoffrey Arthur Peppercorn , Royal Engineers
Capt. Paul Cuthbert Petrie, Royal Field Artillery
Capt. Noel Clive Phillips, Loyal North Lancashire Regiment
Lt. Ian Stanley Ord Playfair, Royal Engineers
Hon. Capt. George Robert Playfair, Army Ordnance Depot
Capt. Geoffrey Francis Plowden, Oxfordshire and Buckinghamshire Light Infantry
Capt. Edward Albert Porch, Supply and Transport Corps, Indian Army
Temp. 2nd Lt. Thomas William Powell, Welsh Regiment
Capt. D'Arcy Power, Royal Army Medical Corps
Capt. Edward Rogers Pratt, Royal Garrison Artillery
Capt. Edward Hulton Preston, Royal Sussex Regiment
2nd Lt. Harold Price-Williams, Royal Field Artillery
Lt. Geoffrey Arthur Prideaux, Somerset Light Infantry
Capt. Humphrey Holland Prideaux, Northumberland Fusiliers
2nd Lt. Percy Malin Pridmore, Royal Warwickshire Regiment
Lt. The Hon. Neil James Archibald Primrose, Buckinghamshire Yeomanry
Lt. John George Prince, Royal Field Artillery
2nd Lt. George Prior, Royal Garrison Artillery
Hon. Capt. George Herbert Pulleyn, Supply and Transport Corps, Indian Army
Capt. Henry George Pyne, Royal Engineers
2nd Lt. John Haylin Quinn, Army Service Corps
Lt. Edmund Rait-Kerr, Royal Engineers
Capt. Geoffrey Grahame Rawson, Royal Engineers
Temp. Lt. Charles James Johnson Reed, Royal Engineers
Temp. Lt. John Percival Reid, Army Ordnance Depot
Capt. Cyril Herbert Reynolds, Royal Garrison Artillery
Lt. Roderick Thomas Herbert Reynolds, Norfolk Regiment
Capt. Bernard Francis Rhodes, Royal Artillery
Temp. Lt. James Ernest Richey, Royal Engineers
Temp. Capt. George Augustus Riddell, Cheshire Regiment
Capt. William Henry Roberts, Royal Engineers
Lt. Oliver John Robertson, 23rd Battalion, London Regiment
Temp. 2nd Lt. Geoffrey Robinson, Connaught Rangers
Capt. George Edward James Antoine Robinson MD, Royal Army Medical Corps
Temp. Capt. Richard Ivan Robson, Royal Irish Rifles
2nd Lt. John Blair Rodger, Scottish Horse Yeomanry
Qtr.-Mst. and Hon Lt. Harry George Rogers, Royal West Kent Regiment
Temp. Lt. Claude Rolo, Army Service Corps
Capt. Alistair Richard Roney Dougal, Royal Artillery
Temp. 2nd Lt. Edward Marshall Rosher, Special List
2nd Lt. Richard Ross, Devon Regiment
Capt. James Rowbotham, Highland Light Infantry
Temp. 2nd Lt. Richard Leggett Rowe, Royal Engineers
Surg.-Capt. William Trethowan Rowe MD, South Nottinghamshire Hussars
Temp. Capt. Ronald Harry Royle, Manchester Regiment
Qtr.-Mst. and Hon Lt. George Robinson Rumsey, Wiltshire Regiment
Temp. Lt. Oscar Julius Tolme Runge, Middlesex Regiment
Rev William Rushby, Army Chaplains' Department
Temp. Lt. John Clement Russell, Royal Field Artillery
Capt. Arthur Gerald Russell, Royal Garrison Artillery
2nd Lt. Frank Irwin Rutherfurd, Royal Field Artillery
Temp. Capt. Herbert Henry Sampson MB , Royal Army Medical Corps
2nd Lt. Clement Richard Folliott, Sandford, King's Own Yorkshire Light Infantry
2nd Lt. Reginald Arthur Savory, 14th Ferozepore Sikhs, Indian Army
2nd Lt. Humphrey Sayer, Sussex Yeomanry
Capt. Hon Percy Gerald Scarlett, East Kent Regiment
Lt. James Geoffrey Schon, Royal Engineers
Lt. Ronald MacKenzie Scobie, Royal Engineers
Capt. Andrew Holmes Scott, Royal Engineers
Temp. Lt. Alan Dald Wyndham Scott, Royal Garrison Artillery
2nd Lt. Thomas Douglas Scott, Royal Engineers
Temp. Lt. John Austin Scrutton, Royal Engineers
Capt. Charles Westrope Selby, Royal Field Artillery
Capt. Herbert Colin Blair Sessions, Gloucestershire Regiment
Capt. Reginald Henry Napier Settle, 19th Hussars
Capt. Edward Sewell, Army Veterinary Corps
Capt. Arthur Godfrey Shaw, East Yorkshire Regiment
Capt. Clement Ridley Shield, Highland Light Infantry
Temp. Capt. George Cecil Shipster, Royal Fusiliers
Capt. Lewis Rudall Shore, Royal Army Medical Corps
Lt. Clement Maurice Simpson, Royal Engineers
2nd Lt. Thomas Cooper Simpson, Royal Engineers
Capt. Esmond Moreton Sinauer, Royal Engineers
Capt. Ernest Cowper Slade, Gloucestershire Regiment
Lt. John Nuttall Slater, Royal Field Artillery
Capt. Gerald Russell Smallwood, East Yorkshire Regiment
Qtr.-Mst. and Hon Lt. William Hudson Smart, Army Service Corps
2nd Lt. Alec Clifton Smith, Fife and Forfar Yeomanry
Lt. Francis Longden Smith, West Riding Regiment
Capt. Bertram Abel Smith, Nottinghamshire Yeomanry
Temp. Capt. Henry Smith, Royal Artillery
Temp. Capt. Herbert George Smith, Army Service Corps
Capt. Tom Vincent Smith, Royal Flying Corps
Capt. Bruce Swinton Smith-Masters, Essex Regiment
Capt. George Osbert Stirling Smyth, Royal Field Artillery
Capt. Dryden George Thompson Sneyd, Royal Garrison Artillery
Sgt.-Maj. Alfred Snow, Royal Engineers
Temp. 2nd Lt. Durbin Sanderson Spark, Somerset Light Infantry
2nd Lt. Hubert Conrad Sparks, 14th Battalion, London Regiment
Temp. 2nd Lt. Arthur Magnus Spence, Special List
Capt. Wilfrid Bliss Spender, Royal Garrison Artillery
2nd Lt. Basil Stephenson, Royal 1st Devonshire Yeomanry
Lt. Ian MacAlister Stewart, Argyll and Sutherland Highlanders
Temp. Capt. Peter Stewart, Highland Light Infantry
Capt. Walter Robert Stewart, Rifle Brigade
Lt. Charles James Stocker MB, Indian Medical Service
Capt. Aleyn Whitley Stokes, Royal Engineers
Temp. Lt. James Strachan, Royal Engineers
2nd Lt. William Victor Strugnell, Hampshire Regiment and Royal Flying Corps
Capt. Eric Scratton Swaine, Northumberland Fusiliers
2nd Lt. Francis Gibbon Swainson, 1/16th London Regiment
Temp. Capt. Matthew Arnold Swan MB, Royal Army Medical Corps
Lt. Francis Patrick Hamilton Synge, Irish Guards
Rev. Edward Keble Talbot, Army Chaplains' Department
Lt. Thomas Francis Tallents, Irish Guards
2nd Lt. George Walter Tanner, Leicestershire Regiment
Temp. Capt. Douglas Compton Taylor , Royal Army Medical Corps
2nd Lt. Samuel Taylor, Worcestershire Regiment
Temp. 2nd Lt. John Stewart Teare, Royal Field Artillery
Rev. William Telfer, Army Chaplains' Department
Capt. James Gilbert Thompson, Liverpool Regiment
2nd Lt. Aubrey Lloyd Sinclair Thomson, Liverpool Regiment
Temp. Lt. Claude Ernest Thompson, South Lancashire Regiment
2nd Lt. Reginald Gresham Thomson, Shropshire Light Infantry
Temp. Capt. Harry Tudor Thornley, Royal Engineers
2nd Lt. Thomas Edward Thorpe, Lancashire Fusiliers
Capt. John Horace Thursfield, South Staffordshire Regiment
Capt. Harry Frederick Otho Thwaites, Royal Engineers
2nd Lt. Arthur Tomlinson, Middlesex Regiment
Temp. Lt. Harold Toulmin, Loyal North Lancashire Regiment
Capt. Robert Douglas Greaves Townend, Army Service Corps
Capt. William Samuel Trail, 57th Wilde's Rifles
Lt. Charles James Traill, Seaforth Highlanders
Lt. Rupert Patrick le Poer Trench, Grenadier Guards
Capt. Reginald Aubrey Turner, Royal Engineers
Temp. 2nd Lt. Richard Turner, Royal Dublin Fusiliers
Temp. Lt. Frederick Harry Turner, Gloucestershire Regiment
Temp. Lt. Herbert William Henry Tyler, Leicestershire Regiment
Lt. Hesperus Andrias van Ryneveld, Royal Flying Corps
Capt. Charles John Wycliff Vasey, Royal Engineers
Lt. John Lyndhurst Vaughan, East Surrey Regiment
Capt. Harry Wilson Verelst, Coldstream Guards
Lt. Arthur Birley Patrick Love Vincent, 3rd Dragoon Guards
Capt. Philip Henry Norris Nugent Vyvyan, Army Service Corps
Temp. Capt. John Alexander Walbcoffe-Wilson, Middlesex Regiment
Capt. Robert Hugh Wade-Gery, Royal Garrison Artillery
Lt. Owen Murton Wales, South Wales Borderers
Lt. Michael Wallington, Royal Sussex Regiment
Temp. Lt. Guy Herbert Walmisley, Royal Engineers
Capt. Charles Herbert Walsh, Connaught Rangers, 32nd Divisional Signal Company
2nd Lt. Leonard Exell Walsh, Army Service Corps
Temp. 2nd Lt. Frederick Vivian Ward-Jones, South Wales Borderers
Temp. 2nd Lt. Robert Warnock, Royal Scots Fusiliers
2nd Lt. John Russell Warren, Royal Engineers
Capt. George Edmund Borlase Watson, Royal Field Artillery
Temp. Qtr.-Mst. and Hon Lt. John Traill Watson, Royal Engineers
2nd Lt. William Charles Gumming Weetman, Nottinghamshire and Derbyshire Regiment
Capt. Lord George Wellesley, Grenadier Guards and Royal Flying Corps
2nd Lt. Gerald Valerian Wellesley, Oxfordshire Hussars
Capfc. Francis Edward Wenger, North Staffordshire Regiment
Capt. Charles Francis Russell Nugent Weston , Royal Engineers
Temp. Capt. Sidney Albert Westrop, Motor Machine Gun Service
Lt. Christopher Probart Whitaker, Dorsetshire Regiment
Sgt.-Maj. Charles Henry Whitcombe, Royal Field Artillery
Qtr.-Mst. and Hon Lt. Ernest O'Brien White, Border Regiment
Temp. Capt. George White, Durham Light Infantry
2nd Lt. Geoffrey Ernest Whitfield, Hertfordshire Regiment
2nd Lt. Norman Henry Pownall Whitley, Manchester Regiment
Temp. Lt. Noel Stewart Whitton MB, Royal Army Medical Corps
2nd Lt. Robert Baldwin Whitworth, Royal Field Artillery
Lt. Edward Whur, Essex Regiment
Capt. John Oldknow Widdows, North Lancashire Regiment
2nd Lt. Frederick Joseph Wilde, Army Service Corps
Capt. Harry Findlater Wilkin , Royal Army Medical Corps
Lt. James Fischer Wilkinson, Royal Field Artillery
2nd Lt. George Edward Wilkinson, Northumberland Fusiliers
2nd Lt. William George Bransby Williams, Royal Flying Corps
Lt. Guy Williams, London Regiment
2nd Lt. Graham Billingsby Williams, Leicestershire Regiment
Temp. Lt. James Williams, Army Service Corps
Temp. Capt. Orlando Cyprian Williams, Special List
Temp. Capt. William Renfrew Wilson, Royal Engineers
Capt. Denis Daly Wilson, 17th Cavalry, Indian Army
Temp. 2nd Lt. Frank Wisher, Royal Field Artillery
Capt. William Allsop Wistance, South Staffordshire Regiment
Capt. Thomas Stafford Wollocombe, Middlesex Regiment
Temp. Capt. Edgar William Wood, South Staffordshire Regiment
Rev. Claude Thomas Thellusson Wood, Army Chaplains' Department
Capt. Austin Hale Woodbridge, Middlesex Regiment
Lt. William Talbot Woods, Manchester Regiment
Capt. Frank Rupert Woollcombe, Royal Garrison Artillery
2nd Lt. Sidney John Worsley, North Staffordshire Regiment
Temp. 2nd Lt. Percy Worthington, Middlesex Regiment
2nd Lt. Alexander Allen Wright, Royal Lancaster Regiment
2nd Lt. James Percy Wright, Royal Artillery
Temp. Capt. William Wright, King's Own Scottish Borderers
Temp. Lt. Charles Walter Glade Wright, Somerset Light Infantry
Temp. Capt. Frank John Sadler Wyeth, Essex Regiment
Lt. Victor Llewellyn Young, Gloucestershire Regiment
2nd Lt. Walter Dillon Zeller, Royal Engineers

Australian Imperial Force
Capt. and Qtr.-Mst. Alexander Elijah Clarke, Army Medical Corps
Capt. Hoy Victor Cutler, Australian Engineers
Capt. William James Macavoy Locke, 13th Battalion
Rev. William McKenzie, Army Chaplains' Department
Capt. Francis Thornthwaite, Field Artillery
Capt. Arthur Andrew White, 1st Light Horse Regiment
Qtr.-Mst. and Hon Lt. Edmond Tudor Boddam, Army Medical Corps
Lt. John Heathcote Newmarch, Field Artillery
Lt. Inglis Peter Stewart, 22nd Battalion
2nd Lt. John Lyall Smith, 25th Battalion

Canadian Force
Capt. Allan de Vere Connors, 10th Infantry Battalion
Capt. Harold William Alexander Foster, 20th Infantry Battalion
Capt. Gwynne Ivor Gwynn, 29th Infantry Battalion
Capt. Patterson Lindsay Hall, 24th Infantry Battalion
Capt. George Edward Kidd, Army Medical Corps
Capt. Edwin Russell Leather, Canadian Field Artillery
Capt. Frederick William Miller, 4th Infantry Battalion
Capt. Georges-Philéas Vanier, 22nd Infantry Battalion
Capt. William Basil Wedd, 3rd Infantry Battalion
Hon. Capt. Rev. Wolstan Thomas Workman, Army Chaplain's Department
Lt. George Cecil Carvell, Princess Patricia's Canadian Light Infantry
Lt. Murdock Neil McPhee, Canadian Engineers

Newfoundland Contingent
Capt. Adolph Ernest Bernard, 1st Newfoundland Regiment

New Zealand Imperial Force
Capt. George Henry Holland, Auckland Battalion
Capt. James Macdonald Richmond, N.Z. Artillery
2nd Lt. William Houkamau Stainton, Māori Contingent

Royal Red Cross (RRC)

Royal Red Cross, 1st Class
Queen Alexandra's Imperial Military Nursing Service

Territorial Force Nursing Service

Australian Army Nursing Service
E. A. Conyers
E. Gray
J. McHardie White
J. McWhite

Canadian Nursing Service
M. O. Boulter, Matron (Assistant Matron-in-Chief)
E. M. Charleson
A. C. Strong
B. J. Willoughby
E. M. Wilson

New Zealand Nursing Service
M. M. Cameron
A. Tombe

American Nursing Service
M. I. Patten

Nursing Staff of Military and War Hospitals
E. L. Flangan
M. Macrae

Nursing Staff of Civil Hospitals
E. Barry
M. F. Bostock

Civil Hospitals Reserve
C. Todd

British Red Cross Society
Lady Ethel Lucy Perrott

Royal Red Cross, 2nd Class

Queen Alexandra's Imperial Military Nursing Service

Territorial Force Nursing Service

Australian Army Nursing Service
P. M. Boissier
E. S. Davidson
A. G. Douglas
J. B. Johnson
E. F. Lee-Archer
E. M. Menhennet
F. Nicholls
L. C. Pratt
T. E. Thomas

Canadian Nursing Service
M, K. Douglas
M. E. Gardiner
M. M. Goodeve
S. M. Hoerner
C. I. Scoble

New Zealand Nursing Service
V. McLean

South African Nursing Service
H. L. Bestor
G. E. Francis
M. A. Fynn

Nursing Staff of Military and War Hospitals

Nursing Staff of Civil Hospitals

Distinguished Conduct Medal (DCM) 
Pnr. Sgt. A. G. F. Ackary, South Lancashire Regiment
Sgt. A. Adams, Welsh Regiment
Sgt. (Acting Company Sgt-Maj) T. Aitken, Border Regiment
Acting Bombardier A. Allan, Royal Field Artillery
Company Sgt-Maj M. A. Alldridge, South Lancashire Regiment
Cpl. A. E. Allibone, Northern Regiment
Pte. G. R. Allport, Army Service Corps
Sgt. J. Anderson, Middlesex Regiment
Sgt. N. E. Andrews, Dorset Yeomanry
Sgt-Maj. J. Archibald, l/3rd Scottish Horse
Sgt. (Acting Company Sgt-Maj.) J. Armstrong, Cheshire Field Company, Royal Engineers
Pte. H. D. Ashley, Dorset Yeomanry
Cpl. T. S. Askin, Royal Field Artillery
Sgt. H. Atkin, Royal Field Artillery
Acting Cpl. T. W. Attkins, Oxfordshire and Bucks Light Infantry
Pte. A. Ault, Notts and Derby Regiment
Company. Sgt-Maj. (Acting Sgt-Maj.) F. F. Bailey, London Regiment
Company Sgt-Maj. H. Baker, Liverpool Regiment
Pte. C. Banham, l/3rd East Anglian Field Ambulance, Royal Army Medical Corps
Sgt. (Acting Company. Sgt-Maj.) H. Banks, West Yorkshire Regiment
L./C. A. Barclay, Ayrshire Yeomanry
Sgt. C. Barnes, Manchester Regiment
Sgt. B. K. Barnes, Northumberland Fusiliers
Cpl. E. Barnes, Bedfordshire Regiment.
Cpl. J. Barrett, South Wales Borderers
Sgt. W. H. Barrett, London Regiment
Bombardier. E. Bartlett, Royal Field Artillery
Cpl. W. Barry, Royal Fusiliers
Pte. G. Barton, 11th Hussars
Company. Sgt-Maj. C. J. Bastable, Royal Engineers
Sgt. C. A. Batham, Lancashire Fusiliers
L./Sgt. G. J, Batley, Norfolk Regiment
Acting. Bombardier. F. Batt, Royal Field Artillery
Pte. H. Baulcomb, Royal Army Medical Corps
Acting Sgt-Maj. (now Quartermaster and Hon. Lt.) R. Baxter, West Riding Regiment
Cpl. B. Baynes, York and Lancaster Regiment
L./C. A. St. J. Beale, Buckinghamshire Yeomanry
Sgt. J. Beards, South Staffordshire Regiment
C.Q.M.S. E. S. Beech, Seaforth Highlanders
Sapper J. Beech, l/2nd West Lancashire Field Company
Company Sgt-Maj. E. P. Bell, London Regiment
Sgt. (Acting Company Sgt-Maj.) B. P. Bellamy, York and Lancaster Regiment
Sgt-Maj. G. P. Bennett, W. Riding Regiment
Pte. W. G. Bennett, Gloucestershire Regiment.
Pte. C. Bent, 7th Bn., Lancashire Fusiliers
Acting Sgt. J. Bentley, Royal Engineers
Sgt-Maj. M. R. Bertram, Argyll and Sutherland Highlanders.
Sgt. (Acting. Staff Sgt-Maj.) W. G. Bews, Army Service Corps
Q.M.S. (Acting. Sgt-Maj) R. C. Blair, Royal Army Medical Corps
Sgt. G. Blyth, Manchester Regiment
Acting. Sgt. W. C. Bodycott, Leicester Regiment
Acting. Sgt-Maj L. Bonney, Royal Sussex Regiment
Staff Sgt-Maj A. E. J. Booth, Army Service Regiment
Staff Sgt-Maj F. Booth, Royal Army Medical Corps
Sgt. (Acting. Company Q.M.S.) J. W. Booth, West Yorkshire Regiment
Sgt. D. N. Borthwick, Durham Light Infantry
Sgt. W. Boyd, Argyll and Sutherland Highlanders
Staff Sgt-Maj. M. W. Boyer, Army Service Corps
Company Sgt-Maj. A. Boyle, Royal Scots Fusiliers
L./C. C. Bradley, Dorset Yeomanry
Bombardier. J. Bradley, Royal Field Artillery
Sapper. W. Bradshaw, Royal Engineers
Company Sgt-Maj. J. Brammall, Yorkshire Regiment
Cpl. W. Branson, Leicestershire Regiment
Acting Sgt-Maj. J. Brass, Royal Scots Fusiliers
Company Sgt-Maj. J. Brennan, Manchester Regiment
L./Sht. A. G. C. Bridger, Coldstream Guards
Company Sgt-Maj. (Acting. Sgt/Maj.) J. G. Brooker, East Kent Regiment.
Pte. G. Brown, Royal Scots Fusiliers
Sgt. P. Brown, Cameron Highlanders
Pte. W. Brown, Argyll & Sutherland Highlanders
Pte. H. Bryant, Bedfordshire Regiment
Cpl. J. T. Bryant, London Regiment
Acting Bombardier F. Buckingham, Royal Field Artillery
Sqdn. Sgt-Maj. F. Bunker, Hertfordshire Yeomanry
Company Sgt-/Maj. G. Burnop, Essex Regiment
Pte. W. J. Burns, Royal Welch Fusiliers
Pte. H. Burrows, Royal Berkshire Regiment
Sgt. J. Bury, West Riding Regiment
Sgt-Maj. A. W. Bush, Royal Field Artillery
Sgt-Maj. C. H. Buss, Somerset Light Infantry
Sgt. H. T. Byles, Royal Engineers
Company Sgt-Maj. P. P. Byrne, Liverpool Regiment
Sgt. W. Cadden, Lancashire Fusiliers
Acting Sgt-Maj. W. Callow, Royal Warwickshire Regiment
Sgt. E. Catherall, Royal Welch Fusiliers
Cpl. W. B. Chambers, Royal Engineers
L/C. C. J. Chapman, Buckinghamshire Yeomanry
Cpl. H. Chasney 1st Berkshire Yeomanry
Company Sgt-Maj. G. Christie, Royal Engineers
Sgt. T. Christie, Royal Engineers
Staff Q.M.S. (Acting Staff Sgt-Maj) R. Clayton, Army Service Corps
Company Sgt-Maj. T. F. Clements, Royal Engineers
Sgt. D. J. Clow, 2nd Scottish Horse
L/C. A. Cohen, Liverpool Regiment
L/C. A. Collens, Manchester Regiment
L/C. C. Collins, Dorset Yeomanry
Sgt. C. A. Collins, A. Cyclist Corps
Sgt. C. B. Colston, Royal Engineers
Cpl. W. H. Corkish, 20th Infantry Brigade
Sgt. P. Costello, Scots Guards
Cpl. (Acting Company Sgt-Maj) C. Couchman, Royal Engineers
Pte. W. Coulter, 2nd Scottish Horse
Acting. Company Sgt-Maj J. A. Cox, London Regiment
L./Sgt. S. A. De Ste. Croix, Royal Warwickshire Regiment
Company Sgt-Maj. F. Croome, Gloucestershire Regiment
Company Sgt-Maj. M. T. Cumming, Seaforth Highlanders
Sgt. W. H. Cunnington, Norfolk Regiment
Pte. H. Curtis, Gloucestershire Regiment
Pte. W. H. Curtis, Dorset Regiment
Flight Sgt. H. G. Dadley, Royal Flying Corps.
Sgt. L. G. Dance, Royal Field Artillery
L./Sgt. J. S. Danks, Coldstream Guards
Staff Sgt-Maj. W. L. Dargan, Army Service Corps
Sgt. H. E. Davey, Hertfordshire Regiment
Sapper J. H. Davey, Royal Monmouthshire Royal Engineers
Company Sgt-Maj. H. M. Davies, Royal Engineers
L./C. A. Davis, Manchester Regiment
Pte. R. D. Davis, West Riding Regiment
Sgt. A. W. Davison, Royal Engineers
Sgt. W. E. Dawson, Norfolk Yeomanry
Sgt. M. Day, Worcestershire Regiment
Sgt. A. Dearman, Yorkshire Regiment
Pte. J. Deas, 1st Bn., Cameron Highlanders
Cpl. (Acting. Sgt.) D.A. Dewar, Royal Engineers
Company Sgt-Maj H.Deyermond, 82nd Royal Engineers
Pte. (Acting Cpl.) T. G. Dickens, Grenadier Guards.
Pnr. (Acting L./C.) R. Dicker, Royal Engineers
L./Sgt. W. E. Digby, A. Cyclist Corps
Sgt. (Acting Company Sgt-Maj) T. G. Dixon, Royal Engineers
R.Q.M.S. L. Dowle, Devon Regiment
Pte T. Dowling, Northumberland Fusiliers
Cpl. S. G. Downs, Royal Field Artillery
Sgt. H. F. Drewry, Lincolnshire Regiment
Staff Sgt. W. Dudding, 1st Indian Mule Cart Corps
Pte. (Acting L./C.) Dufour-Clark, Army Service Corps
L./C. T. Dunn, Royal Scots
Sgt. A. Durrant, Royal Engineers
Company Sgt-Maj. L. Dwyer, Welsh Regiment
Company. Q./M.S. J. Dyke, Wiltshire Regiment
 L./C. E. E. Eames, London Regiment
Cpl. S. V. Edge, Middlesex Regiment
Cpl. T. Edney, Royal Garrison Artillery.
Company Sgt-Maj T. J. Edwards, North Lancashire Regiment
Sgt. H. G. England, West Riding Regiment
Staff Sgt-Mgr. M. H. Faint, Army Service Corps
Company Sgt-Mgr P. E. Fairley, London Regiment
Acting Bombardier A. W. Farnfield, Royal Field Artillery
Acting Sgt-Mgr. M. J. Farnworth, North Lancashire Regiment
Sapper. J. Farrell, Royal Engineers
Sgt. L. Farrington, A. Cyclist Corps
Acting Battery. Q.M.S. W. W. Fenn, Royal Garrison Artillery
Acting Staff Sgt. E. Fenner, Royal Army Medical Corps
Acting L./C. R. Ferguson, Highland Light Infantry
Cpl. (Acting Sgt.) J. Firth, West Yorkshire Regiment
Sapper R. Fogg, Royal Engineers
Pte. J. Folan, Connaught Rangers
Sgt-Maj. W. Forbes, Seaforth Highlanders
Sgt. E. Ford, Royal Highlanders
 L./Sgt. S. Ford, Wiltshire Regiment
Sgt. W. J. Fordham, Royal Horse Artillery
Sgt. W. T. Foster, Royal Engineers
Company Sgt-Maj G. E. Fowler, Bedfordshire Regiment
Pte. T. Foy, South Lancashire Regiment
Bombardier J. Francey, Royal Field Artillery
Sgt. G. W. Franks, Royal Engineers
Company Sgt-Maj C. W. Froome, London Regiment
Company Sgt-Maj. G. A. Fuller, West Riding Regiment
Pte. (Acting Cpl.) W. J. Gaffney, Essex Regiment
Acting. Cpl. H. Garner, Rifle Brigade
Acting Sgt. J. Gaskarth, Royal Engineers
Company Sgt-Maj. E. E. Gawthorn, Royal Engineers
Sgt-Maj. T. Geggie, King's Own Scottish Borderers
Pte. W. George, Royal Highlanders
Sgt. S. Gibbins, Welsh Regiment
Sub-Condr. (Acting. Condr.) T. A. Gibbon, Army Ordnance Corps
Sgt. W. M. Gibbs, Dorset Yeomanry
Cpl. R. Gibney, Royal Irish Fusiliers.
Pte. D. Gibson, Royal Scottish Fusiliers
Pte. D. Gildea, Yorkshire Regiment
L./C. R. Gilholme, Northumberland Fusiliers
Battery Sgt-Mag C. Gill, Motor Machine Gun Service
Sgt. R. W. Gill, Manchester Regiment
Cpl. E. J. Gingell, Gloucestershire Regiment.
Sgt-Maj. M. E. J. Glazebrook, Royal Welch Fusiliers
Acting Company Sgt-Maj. C. V. Goble, Royal Scots Fusiliers
L./C. J. Golding, Lancashire Fusiliers
Trans. Sgt. A. Gordon, London Regiment
Sapper A. Gourlay, Royal Engineers
Staff Sgt-Maj. G. H. Gracey, Army Service Corps
Sgt. J. H. Graham, North Lancashire Regiment
Battery Sgt-Maj. H. Grant, Royal Field Artillery
Cpl. J. M. Grant, Ceylon Planters' Rifle Corps, Ind. Army
Sgt. J. Grayston, Royal Engineers
Sgt. L. E. Green, Royal Engineers
Sgt. W. Greenall, Liverpool Regiment
Sgt. J. Greenhalgh, Manchester Regiment
Sapper W. Grice, Royal Engineers
Company Sgt-Maj. E. B. Griggs, Royal Engineers
Sgt. A. F. Grimble, Yorkshire Regiment
Staff Sgt-Maj. A. C. Grimwood, Army Service Corps
Sgt. I. T. Guest, Royal Engineers
L/C. R. E. Guy, Dorset Yeomanry
Condr. P. A. Hadland, Army Ordnance Corps
Sgt. W. Halsey, Hampshire Regiment
Sgt. P. Hambley, 26th By., Royal Field Artillery
Sgt. F. R. Hamilton, Yorkshire Regiment
L./C. J. Hampshire, Royal Engineers
Q.M.S. T. Hampton, Royal Highlanders
Company Sgt-Maj.(Acting Sgt-Maj. T.Hannon, Royal Welch Fusiliers
Sgt. F. Harding, North Somerset Yeomanry
L./C. (Acting 2nd Cpl.) W. J. Hargreaves, Royal Engineers
Temp. Sgt-Maj. S. Harman, Army Veterinary Corps
Staff Sgt-Maj. J. Harold, Army Service Corps
Sgt. T. Harper, Machine Gun Company (formerly Gordon Highlanders)
Pte. P. Harrigan, Royal Scots Fusiliers
Cpl. H. Hart, Berkshire Yeomanry
Company Sgt-Maj. M.T. Hart, Royal West Surrey Regiment
Sgt. A. Harvey, Lancashire Fusiliers
Cpl. F. Harvey, Suffolk Regiment
Sgt. R. T. C. Hassell, Royal Fusiliers
Acting Sgt-Maj. J. E. Hawkes, London Regiment
Sgt. T. Hawkins, South Staffordshire Regiment
Cpl. C. Hayward, Royal Berkshire Regiment
Company Sgt-Maj. (Actg. Sgt-Maj.) C. Hazlehurst, North Staffordshire Regiment
L./Sgt. J. Hazlett, Royal Scots Fusiliers
R.Q.M.S. R. W. Hearn, Royal Sussex Regiment
Sgt. E. Heath, Royal Field Artillery
Sgt-Maj. E. Heaysman, Royal Lancashire Regiment
Company Sgt-Maj. J. Heigh, Royal Engineers
Company Sgt-Maj. J. E. Henderson, Border Regiment
Sgt. M. P. Hennessey, Royal Welch Fusiliers
Sgt. W. W. Hepher, Royal Engineers
Company Sgt-Maj. (Acting Sgt-Maj.) G. E. E. Hewes, Yorkshire Light Infantry.
Cpl. E. M. Hewson, Leicestershire Regiment
Company Sgt-Maj. H. Hibbett, Royal West Kent Regiment
Cpl. R. P. Higgins, Buckinghamshire Yeomanry
Sgt-Maj. (now 2nd Lt.) A. J. Hill, Wiltshire Regiment
Battery Sgt-Maj. A.J. Hill, Royal Field Artillery
Company Sgt-Maj. G. Hill, London Regiment
Cpl. T. H. Hilliar, Gloucestershire Regiment
Company Sgt-Maj. M.J. Hodge, Liverpool Regiment
Sgt. S. Holloway, London Regiment
Sgt. P. H. Holman, Royal Garrison Artillery
Staff Sgt. H. S. Holmes, Army Service Corps
Acting Sgt-Maj. J. T. Hood, Royal Field Artillery.
Sgt. D. Hook, Royal Scots
Acting Cpl. A. R. Hooper, Royal Garrison Artillery
Sgt. (Acting Staff Sgt-Maj.) C.W.Hopkins, Army Service Corps
Q.M.S. T. Horler, Somerset Light Infantry
Company Sgt-Maj W. G. Howard, Notts and Derby Regiment
Battery. Sgt-Maj T. W. Howes, Royal Field Artillery
Company Sgt-Maj. W.H.Hudson, Royal Engineers
Pte. P. Hull, Army Service Corps
Staff Sgt-Maj H. E. Humphries, Army Service Corps
Company Sgt-Maj. R. Hunter, Durham Light Infantry
Sjt. F. C. Jackson, E. Surrey Regiment (Sgt-Maj. London Regiment)
Acting Sgt-Maj H. A. Jackson, Lincolnshire Regiment
Pte. J. Jackson, Essex Regiment
Cpl. (Acting Sgt.) T. G. Jackson, 2nd Dragoon Guards
Cpl. H. Jacobs, London Regiment
Cpl. F. R. James, Royal Fusiliers
Sqdn. Q.M.S. W. R. James, Dorset Yeomanry
Acting Company Sgt-Maj. J. Jarvis, Welsh Regiment
L./C. A. Jones, Bedfordshire Regiment
Pte. C. F. Jones, 6th Bn., Lincolnshire Regiment
L./C. C. H. Jones, Welsh Regiment
Sgt. I. Jones, Welsh Regiment
Cpl. J. G. Jones, Royal Field Artillery
Sgt. R. O. Jones, Royal Engineers
L./C. E. Joyce, Royal Welch Fusiliers
Acting Sgt. W. A. Judge, Army Service Corps
Sgt. A. E. Keane, Military Mounted Police.
Pte. W. J. Keen, Essex Regiment
Sgt. S. Keith, Gordon Highlanders
Sgt. J. B. Kelly, Welsh Regiment
Sgt. W. Kelly, King's Own Scottish Borderers
Cpl. P. H. Kendall, Royal Field Artillery
L./C. A. Kennard, 5th Lancers
Acting Battery Sgt-Maj. F. Kennedy, l/2nd Lovat's Scouts
Acting. Cpl. J. Kerr, Royal Highlanders.
Company Sgt-Maj. W. Kerrigan, Leinster Regiment
Pte. C. Kershaw, Coldstream Guards
Cpl. W. H.. King, Royal North Devon Yeomanry
Sgt. A. G. Kirkwood, Royal Engineers
Pte. L. Knott, Royal Welch Fusiliers (late South Wales Borderers)
L./C. J. Knox, Royal Scots Fusiliers
Sgt. J. Lacy, Royal Engineers
Battery Sgt-Maj. J. Lamb, Royal Field Artillery
L./C. W. Lamplugh, Royal Army Medical Corps.
Pte. L. Lawton, North Staffordshire Regiment
Sgt.-Drmr. E. C. Lee, Essex Regiment
Company Sgt-Maj. G. Lee, Yorkshire Light Infantry.
Cpl. J. T. Lees, Royal Engineers
L./C. W. R. Lees, Royal Irish Rifles
Staff Sgt. F. G. Levings, Indian Army
Company Sgt-Maj M. W. Lightfoot, Border Regiment
Pte. W. H. Lines, Norfolk Regiment
Pte. S. Littleford, Manchester Regiment
Squadron Sgt-Maj. A. Littleworth, Dorset Yeomanry
Company Sgt-Maj. E. Lockwood, Royal Engineers
Company Sgt-Maj. H. Lodge, West Yorkshire Regiment
L./C. S. Lovejoy, Royal Highlanders
Sgt. F. H. Lucas, Royal Army Medical Corps
Sgt. H. G. Lupton, London Regiment
L./C. D. MacAulay, Cameron Highlanders
Acting Sgt-Maj. C. MacDonald, Manchester Regiment
Company Sgt-Maj (Acting Sgt-Maj.) J. Mackie, Liverpool Regiment
Pte. F. T. Major, 10th Bn., London Regiment
Battery Sgt-Maj. H. Males, Royal Field Artillery
Acting Bombardier. A. E. Marsh, Royal Field Artillery
Gunner G. W. G. Marshall, Royal Horse Artillery
Trooper. A. L. Martin, 3rd County of London Yeomanry
Company Sgt-Maj. E. A. Mascott, Royal Highlanders
Company Sgt-Maj. G. Mason, Seaforth Highlanders.
Sgt. E. B. May, 3rd County of London Yeomanry
Pte. F. McCann, 1st Dragoons.
Company Sgt-Maj. T. McCarty, Manchester Regiment
Company Sgt-Maj. B. A. McCombie, London Regiment
Pte. L. McDougall, 1st Lovat's Scouts
Company Sgt-Maj. A. McDowell, Manchester Regiment
Sgt. J. McFarland, Motor Machine Gun Service (late 20th Hussars)
Cpl. M: McGeoch, l/3rd Scottish Horse
Company Sgt-Maj. J. McHardy, Royal Highlanders
Pte. J. R. Mclritree, Essex Regiment
Flight-Sgt. (Acting Sgt-Maj.) H. McKenna, Royal Flying Corps
Sgt. D. McLean, Argyll & Sutherland Highlanders
Pte. A. McLellan, 1st Lovat's Scouts
2nd Cpl. (Acting. Cpl.) T. E. McNally, Royal Engineers
Sqdn. Sgt-Maj. R. McWatt, 2nd Scottish Horse
Sjt. J. Medlock, York and Lancaster. Regiment
Staff Sgt-Maj. C.E. Metcalf, Army Service Corps
Acting Bombardier F. Miles, Royal Field Artillery
Company. Sgt-Maj. A. W. Miller, South Wales Borderers
Acting Regimental Sgt-Maj. W. Miller, Royal Garrison Artillery
Acting Company Q.M.S. J. E. Mills, Cheshire Regiment
Company Sgt-Maj. W. H. Mills, Royal West Kent Regiment
Acting Sgt-Maj.. A. Milton, Bedfordshire Regiment
L./C. L. C. Mires, 4th Hussars
Sub. Condr. (Acting Condr.) P.J. Moloney, Army Ordnance Corps
L./C. R. Moore, Norfolk Regiment
Company Sgt-Maj. E. H. Morgan, Wiltshire Regiment
Pte. W. Morgan, South Wales Borderers
Sgt-Maj W. J. Morris, Royal Engineers
Pte. A. Morrison, Army Service Corps
Acting Sgt-Maj. M. J. Morrison, Manchester Regiment
Acting Company Sgt-Maj. F. Mortimer, Nottinghamshire & Derbyshire Regiment
Pte. (Acting L./C.) R. Morton, King's Own Scottish Borderers
Pte. J. S. Murphy, 8th Hussars
Pte S. Murphy, Royal Irish Rifles
Condr. D. Murray, Army Ordnance Corps
Company Sgt-Maj. R. Murray, Seaforth Highlander
Sgt. H. J. Musto, Royal Berkshire Regiment
Sgt-Maj. W. Myers, Northumberland Fusiliers
Sgt. E. Nash, Gloucestershire Regiment
Drmr. E. G. Neal, London Regiment
Sgt. (Acting Company Sgt-Maj.) A. Needham, Royal Engineers
Sgt. J. R Neilson, Royal Engineers
Sgt. W. Ness, South Lancashire Regiment
L./C. J. Newsham, Lancashire Fusiliers
Company Sgt-Maj. E. Nicholson, South Lancashire Regiment.
Sqdn. Sgt-Maj. F. G. Nicholson, 19th Hussars
Sgt. T. Oates, Royal Engineers
Acting Sgt. P. O'Brien, Royal Munster Fusiliers
Sgt. J. O'Connor, Royal Dublin Fusiliers
Sqdn. Sgt-Maj. A. Ogilvie, 1st Fife and Forfar Yeomanry
Superintending Clerk C. J. O'Keefe, Royal Engineers
Sgt. F. Owen, Royal Engineers
Company Sgt-Maj. H. Oxley, King's Royal Rifle Corps
Acting Sgt-Maj. H. Page, Royal Sussex Regiment
Pte. W. Page, Army Service Corps
Gunner (Acting Bombardier) W. E. Page, Royal Horse Artillery
Bombardier. J. W. Palmer, Royal Field Artillery
Sgt-Maj. G. Parker, North Staffordshire Regiment (now 2nd Lt., Hampshire Regiment)
Company Sgt-Maj. F. W. Pascall, Royal Fusiliers
Sgt. H. Passmore, Royal Garrison Artillery
Actg. Bombardier G. Pateman, Royal Field Artillery
Company Sgt-Maj. P. Pattison, Royal Welch Fusiliers
Sgt. R. C. Payne, Royal Engineers
Sgt. E. M. Pearce, B. By., Royal Field Artillery
Cpl. (Acting Sgt.) C. T. Pearse, Royal Engineers
Company Sgt-Maj. C. Pearson, Royal West Kent Regiment
Sgt. G. R. Pearson, Durham Light Infantry
Pte. S. T. Peet, East Kent Regiment
Battery. Sgt-Maj. W. J. Perigo, Royal Field Artillery
Company Sgt-Maj. H. R. Phelps, Army Service Corps
Pte. H. F. Pickering, Royal Warwickshire Regiment
Acting Company Sgt-Maj. D. Pickford, Nottinghamshire and Derbyshire Regiment
Bombardier N. Pigot, Royal Field Artillery
Pte. J. Pittendreigh, 1st Scottish Horse
Pte. W. G. Polain, Worcestershire Regiment
Company Sgt-Maj. D. N. Pollock, Cameron Highlanders
Staff Sgt. (Acting. Staff Sgt-Maj.) C. H. Porter, Army Service Corps
Sgt-Maj. E. Porter, Royal Flying Corps
Sgt. F. W. Potts, Manchester Regiment
Pte. G. Powell, Army Service Corps
Sapper H. Proctor, Royal Engineers
Pte. T. J. Puplett, Army Service Corps
Q.M.S. F. J. Purnell, Gloucestershire Regiment
Sgt. E. J. Quick, Royal Engineers
Sgt-Maj. W. F. Rainsford, Royal Sussex Regiment
Cpl. J. O. Ramsay, Royal Engineers
Dvr. H. Randall, Army Service Corps
Company Sgt-Maj. H. Ray, S. Lancashire Regiment
R.Q.M.S. G. Reddock, South Lancashire Regiment
Q.M.S. T. W. Redmore, Royal Engineers
Sqdn. Sgt-Maj. (Acting Sgt-Maj.) W. J. Reeves, 2nd Dragoons
Pte. J. Regan, A. Cyclist Corps
Company Sgt-Maj. W. A. Rice, South Lancashire Regiment
Sgt. A. C. Richards, Royal Welch Fusiliers
Sgt. J. J. Richardson, Royal Engineers
Sgt. A. C. Riddett, Rifle Brigade
Acting Battery Sgt-Maj A. Ridgers, Royal Field Artillery
1st Class Staff Sgt-Maj. J. Rigby, Army Service Corps
Gunner H. E. Roach, Royal Field Artillery
Drummer J. E. Roberts, London Regiment
Gunner F. Robinson, Royal Field Artillery
Sgt. J. Robinson, Cameron Highlanders
Pte. J. Rock, King's Royal Rifle Corps
Gunner E. W. Rose, Royal Garrison Artillery
Staff Sgt-Maj. J. W. Rose, Army Service Corps
Sgt. S. W. Roshier, 17th Lancers
Sgt. A. Ross, Royal Engineers
Bombardier. W. Ross, Royal Field Artillery
Sgt. A. Rumbelow, Rifle Brigade
Sgt. J. W. Russell, Royal Engineers
Staff Sgt. (Acting Staff Q.M.S.) A. J. Ryan, Army Service Corps
Company Sgt-Maj. T. Ryan, King's Own Scottish Borderers
Company Sgt-Maj. T. Ryan, Worcestershire Regiment
Gunner P. Ryding, Royal Field Artillery
Cpl. D. Salt, Nottinghamshire and Derbyshire Regiment
Company Sgt-Maj. C. H. Sargeant, Rifle Brigade
Company Sgt-Maj. F. R. Saunders, London Regiment
Company Sgt-Maj (now 2nd Lt.) C. Savin, King's Own Rifle Corps
Pte. H. A. Sawyer, Army Service Corps
Sgt. T. Scothorne, Leicestershire Regiment
Sgt-Maj. A. K. Scott, Cameron Highlanders
Pte. T. Seddon, Manchester Regiment
Sgt-Maj. T. G. Seignior, Essex Regiment
Company Sgt-Maj. (Acting Sgt-Maj.) W. G. Self, Royal Engineers
Sgt. L. M. Sharp, Royal Engineers
Cpl. T. Sharpe, Northern Regiment
Pte. A. Shea, East Lancashire Regiment
L./C. J. Shearer, Scottish Rifles
Acting Bombardier A. Shelley, Royal Field Artillery
Sapper T. Siddons, Royal Engineers
L./Sgt. J. Silcox, South Wales Borderers
L./C. H. W. Simmons, South Wales Borderers
L./C. A. Simpson, West Riding Regiment
Company Sgt-Maj. J. H. Slater, Durham Light Infantry
Pte. C. H. Smith, Royal Fusiliers
Acting Staff Sgt-Maj. E. A. Smith, Army Service Corps
Sgt. G. Smith, Leicestershire Regiment
Sgt. J. Smith, Royal Field Artillery
Company Q.M.S. J. H. Smith, Cheshire Regiment
Cpl. (Acting Sgt.) T. Smith, Leicestershire Regiment
Pte. T. Smith, East Lancashire Regiment
L./Sgt. W. Smith, Royal Fusiliers
Sgt. R. Snowdon, Argyll and Sutherland Highlanders
Company. Sgt-Maj. W. Soughton, Royal Sussex Regiment
Cpl. (Acting. Sjt.) G. J. P. Spollen, Northamptonshire Regiment
Sgt. J. R.Stagg, Middlesex Regiment
L./C. J. G. Staples, Wiltshire Regiment
L./C. (Acting Sgt.) E. Starrs, Highland Light Infantry
Sgt. H. Steel, 4th Dragoon Guards
Sapper D. Stewart, Royal Engineers
Sgt. H. Stewart, Gordon Highlanders
Pte. R. Stewart, Royal Scots Fusiliers
Company Sgt-Maj. A. Stirzaker, West Riding Regiment
L./Sgt. E. E. Stocking, London Regiment
L./C. J. W. Stott, Middlesex Regiment
Temp. Sub. Condr. W.J. Streek, Army Ordnance Corps
Gunner C. G. Street, Royal Garrison Artillery
Acting Cpl. R. C. Sugars, London Regiment
L/C. F. Summers, Yorkshire Light Infantry
Sgt. O. Summers, Royal Warwickshire Regiment
Gunner A. Sweeting, Royal Field Artillery
Pte. H. Sykes, West Riding Regiment
Acting Sgt. T. H. Symonds, Royal Engineers
Acting Bombardier F. Taylor, Royal Horse Artillery
Company Q.M.S. F. Tebbs, Royal Engineers
L./C. J. Temple, Royal Scots
Sgt. J. Thelwell, Royal Welch Fusiliers
Cpl. A. J. Thomas, Royal Engineers
Cpl. L. Thomas, I/1st Berkshire Yeomanry
Pte. S. E. Till, South Staffordshire Regiment
Sgt. A. J. Tilney, 4th Dragoon Guards
Cpl. J. Tindle, Royal Engineers
Pte. W. Tolley, Royal Warwickshire Regiment
Company Sgt-Maj. (Acting Sgt-Maj.) W. H. Tolley, Worcestershire Regiment
Staff Sgt. R. G. Topley, Army Service Corps
Cpl. (Acting Sgt.) J. W. Trimmer, Royal Berkshire Regiment
Sgt. E. Trowbridge, Royal Horse Artillery
Sgt. (Acting Company Sgt-Maj.) H. A. Turner, Shropshire Light Infantry
Acting Sub-Condr. J. G. Turner, Army Ordnance Corps
Cpl. E. Twigg, Manchester Regiment
Sgt-Maj. H. Underwood, Royal Army Medical Corps
Acting Company Sgt-Maj. A. Unwin, Cheshire Regiment
Sgt. J. A. Verner, Royal Irish Rifles
Sapper E. H. Vick, Royal Engineers
L./C. J. A. Vickery, Seaforth Highlanders
Sgt. D. Voyles, Irish Guards
Pte. F. Waddell, Royal Scots
Acting Sgt-Maj. J. H. Wagner, Gloucestershire Regiment
Q.M.S. E. Walker, South Staffordshire Regiment
Gunner J. L, Walker, Royal Field Artillery
Company Sgt-Maj. W. Walker, Suffolk Regiment
Cpl. W. H. Ward, Royal Field Artillery
Company Sgt-Maj. G. Waterhouse, Royal Engineers
Cpl. J. Watkinson, North Lancashire Regiment
Cpl. (Acting Sgt.) J. Waymont, South Staffordshire Regiment
Company Sgt-Maj. P. F. Weaver, Coldstream Guards
Sgt. J. Webber, 1/lst Welsh Horse
Company Sgt-Maj. (Acting Sgt-Maj.) C. Wells, Dorset Regiment
Company Q.M.S. (Acting Sgt-Maj) C. E. White, Coldstream Guards
Sgt. F. White, South Wales Borderers (since transferred to Machine Gun Corps)
L./C. G. Whitehead, East Lancashire Regiment
Staff Q.M.S. J. Whitehouse, Army Service Corps
Sgt. F. Wilkinson, Royal Field Artillery
Pte. G. B. Wilson, Army Service Corps
L./C. J. Wilson, Lanark Yeomanry
Sgt, W. Wilson, Northern Regiment
Sgt. W. Wilson, Lanark Yeomanry
Company Sgt-Maj. A. E. Winton, Royal Engineers
Acting Sgt-Maj. P. Witheridge, Rifle Brigade
Company Sgt-Maj. J. Wood, Wiltshire Regiment
Sgt-Maj. W. Woodman, Royal Field Artillery
Pte. T. Worrall, Middlesex Regiment
L./Sgt. B. Worsley, Worcestershire Regiment
L./C. G. Wright, 14th Hussars
Company Sgt-Maj. W. Wright, South Staffordshire Regiment
Company Sgt-Maj. E. Yates, Scottish Rifles
Sgt. T. H. Young, Royal West Surrey Regiment
L./C. W. Young, East Surrey Regiment

Australian Imperial Force
L./C. T. W. Adeney, Australian Engineers
Cpl. G. D. Cook, 2nd Australian Field Artillery Brigade Headquarters
Pte. J. G. Cosson, Australian Imperial Force
L./C. F. G. Crisp, 1st Aus. Light Horse Regiment
Pte. A. Croft, Australian Imperial Force
Sgt. W. C. Foulsum, Australian Engineers
Pte. W. Goudemey, Australian Imperial Force
Cpl. W. M. Green, Australian Imperial Force
L./C. F. Horan, Australian Imperial Force
Sgt. E. H. Jackson, Australian Imperial Force
L/Cpl. W. H. Kenny, 1st Australian Light Horse Brigade.
Sgt. J. B. Kirkwood, Australian Imperial Force
Cpl. J. M. MacDonald, 2nd Australian Light Horse Regiment
Pte. V. G. R. McDonald, Australian Imperial Force
Cpl. W. McNicol, Australian Artillery
Sgt. F. T. Newsom, Australian Engineers
Pte. W. Nichol, Australian Imperial Force
Sgt. M. J. O'Brien, Australian Imperial Force
Cpl. J. A. Park, Australian Engineers
Trooper. T. Renton, 10th Australian Light Horse Regiment
L./C. W. C. Scurry, Australian Imperial Force
Cpl. J. Shaw, Australian Engineers
Sgt-Maj. H. E. Wawn, Australian Imperial Force

Canadian Force
Pte. F. Armes, 4th Canadian Infantry Battalion
Sgt. J. Cameron, 28th Canadian Infantry Battalion
L./C. O. Denman, 2nd Canadian Infantry Battalion
Gunner J. T. Donnelly, 2nd Canadian Divisional Artillery
Sgt. J. Dungan, 29th Canadian Infantry Battalion
Pte. S. Flansberg, Royal Canadian Regiment
Company Sgt-Maj. W. G. Fraser, 15th Canadian Infantry Battalion
Company Sgt-Maj. J. Girvan, Canadian Army Service Corps
Company Sgt-Maj. C.F. E. Hall, 13th Canadian Infantry Battalion
Company Sgt-Maj. A. Handcock, 14th Canadian Infantry Battalion
Sgt-Maj. W. De F. Henderson, Canadian Engineers
Pte. T. F. Ingram, 25th Canadian Infantry Battalion
Sgt. D. M. Jemmett, 1st Canadian Divisional Engineers
Sigr. R. G. Jones, 3rd Canadian Infantry Battalion
Acting Bombardier E. M. King, Royal Canadian Horse Artillery
Pte. E. Leger, 22nd Canadian Infantry Battalion
Sgt. D. MacRae, 31st Canadian Infantry Battalion
Sgt-Maj. A. G. Mackie, 5th Canadian Infantry Battalion
Sgt-Maj G. C. Massey, Canadian Engineers
Battery Sgt-Maj. N. E. McKinnon, 1st Canadian Divisional Artillery
S.Q.M.S. A. D. McNeill, Lord Strathcona's Horse
Cpl. G. R. McNicol, Canadian Army Service Corps
Cpl. A. McI. Morrison, Canadian Engineers
Cpl. A. C. Oxley, 1st Canadian Divisional Engineers
Company Sgt-Maj. T. Patterson. 27th Canadian Infantry Battalion
Cpl. C. Platts, 1st Canadian Divisional Engineers
Pte. L. Preston, 7th Canadian Infantry Battalion
Pte. E. M. Robertson, 26th Canadian Infantry Battalion
L./C. L. A. Robertson, Canadian Mounted Rifles
Battery Sgt-Maj. J. Smith, 1st Canadian Divisional Artillery

Newfoundland Contingent
Pte. W. J. Gladney, 1st Newfoundland Regiment

New Zealand Force
Pte. J. F. Cardno, New Zealand Medical Corps
Sgt. J. H. Francis, 1st Auckland Battalion, New Zealand Force
Sgt. (now 2nd Lt.) A. G. Henderson, 1st Otago Battalion, New Zealand Force
Sgt S. Jenkins, New Zealand Divisional Train
Sgt. J.Little, Otago Mounted Rifle Regiment, New Zealand Force
Sgt-Maj. F. W. Moor, New Zealand. Medical Corps
Cpl. H. Rhind, Canterbury Battalion, New Zealand Force.

Awarded a Clasp to the Distinguished Conduct Medal
Acting Company Sgt-Maj. W. L. Mclntyre, King's Royal Rifle Corps

Military Medal (MM) 
L./Sgt. (Acting Sgt.) E. Abell, South Staffordshire Regiment
Gunner W. Abigail, Royal Field Artillery
Cpl. E. Adaway, Rifle Brigade
Cpl. F. Ainley, Royal Engineers
Sgt. H. Aitken, Gordon Highlanders
L./C. G. Alcock, Worcestershire Regiment
Cpl. (Acting Sgt.) J. A. Allam, Royal Engineers
2nd Cpl. (Acting Cpl.) G. Allan, Royal Engineers
Pte. G. Allan, Middlesex Regiment
Cpl. J. Allardyce, London Regiment
Sgt. W. Allcock, Nottinghamshire and Derbyshire Regiment
Pte. A. J. Allen, West Yorkshire Regiment
Sgt. (now temp. 2nd Lt.) C. F. Allen, North Lancashire Regiment
Pte. C. R. Allen, Gloucestershire Regiment
Pte. J. Allen, Oxfordshire and Buckinghamshire Light Infantry
Cpl. R. Allison, Yorkshire and Lancashire Regiment
Pte. L. Allthorpe, Norfolk Regiment
Cpl. F. J. Amatt, Royal Engineers
Sgt. H. J. Ambrose, Royal Engineers
Pte. D. B. Anderson, Royal Army Medical Corps
L./C. J. Anderson, West Yorkshire Regiment
L./C. W. Anderson, Highland Light Infantry
L./C. J. Andrews, West Yorkshire Regiment
L./C. L. Andrews, Monmouthshire Regiment
L./C. C. Angulatta, Grenadier Guards
Sgt. T. R. Archibald, Royal Scots
Cpl. G. Armer, 2nd Bn., Yorkshire and Lancashire Regiment
Actg. Sgt, B. G. Ashby, Northamptonshire Regiment
L./Sgt. A. E. Ashley, East Yorkshire Regiment
Sgt. E. Ashley, Royal Field Artillery
Cpl. T. Askin, Royal Field Artillery
L./Sgt. J. Aspey, Highland Light Infantry
L./C. H. O. Asquith, Yorkshire and Lancashire Regiment
Pte. G. T. Atkins, Essex Regiment
Cpl. C. J. Atkinson, Bedfordshire Regiment
Pte. R. H. Atkinson, West Riding Regiment
Sapper J. Axon, Royal Engineers
Cpl. J. Aynsley, Northumberland Fusiliers
L./C. P. Bacher, Northamptonshire Regiment
Sgt. N. H. Bacon, Rifle Brigade
Sgt. J. Baggley, Lincolnshire Regiment
Cpl. H. C.Bagley, Royal Warwickshire Regiment
Pte. J. H. Baker, Royal West Kent Regiment
Sgt. F. Baker, Royal Irish Fusiliers
Sgt. W. C. Baldrey, London Regiment
Sgt. I. H. Baldwin, Royal Field Artillery
Sgt. J. W. Baldwin, Oxfordshire and Buckinghamshire Light Infantry
Sapper S. Ballett, Royal Engineers
Sgt. F. W. Bamber, Royal Engineers
Sgt. E. L. Bamberger, Royal Engineers
L./Sgt. (now temp. 2nd Lt.) R. C. Bambridge, Royal Fusiliers
L./C. A. Barber, Essex Regiment
Cpl. J. Barbossa, Lancashire Fusiliers
Pte. T. Barbour, Scottish Rifles
Pte. W. Barnes, South Staffordshire Regiment
Sgt R. W. Barrett, London Regiment '
Cpl. J. Barrington, Royal Fusiliers
L/Sgt. H. Barrow, West Riding Regiment.
Sgt. G. Bate, King's Royal Rifle Corps
Cpl. (Acting Sgt.) J.S. Bateman, 9th Lancers
Sapper F. J. Bates, Royal Engineers
L./C. G. A. Bates, Bedfordshire Yeomanry
Pte. W. Batley, Middlesex Regiment
Gunner F. J. Battersby, Royal Field Artillery
Pte. R. Baxter, 2nd Dragoons
Sgt. G. A. Bayley, Royal Engineers
Sgt. G. 3. Bayley, London Regiment
Pte. G. Beach, South Wales Borderers
Gunner R. Beadnell, Royal Field Artillery
Sgt. J. R. Bean, Royal Fusiliers
Sgt. A. W. Beasley, Royal Berkshire Regiment
Cpl. (Actg. Sgt.) B. J. Beckett, Royal Engineers
Staff Sgt. (Actg. Staff Sgt-Maj.) W. A. Bedding, Army Service Corps
Sgt. (Actg. Staff Sgt.) W, Beer, Army Veterinary Corps
Sapper A. G. Beeson, Royal Engineers
Pte. J. G. Begg, Gordon Highlanders
Gunner S. Belding, Motor Machine Gun Service.
Cpl. A. Bell, Royal Garrison Artillery
Flight Sgt. (Acting Sgt-Maj.) T. Bell, Royal Flying Corps
Sgt. W. Bell, Royal Lancashire Regiment
Acting Cpl. T. Belliss, Royal Engineers
Pte. H. Benjamin, Welsh Regiment
Staff Q.M.S. (Acting Staff Sgt-Maj) C. G. Bennett, Army Service Corps
Pte. H. Bennett, Leicestershire Regiment
Sgt. F. D. Benson, Coldstream Guards
L./Sgt. A. Berry, Yorkshire Light Infantry
Pte. C. H. Bettesworth, Coldstream Guards
Gunner A. Bickley, Royal Garrison Artillery
Sgt. W. Biddle, Gloucestershire Regiment
Sgt. C. Bignell, Oxfordshire and Buckinghamshire Light Infantry
Pte. W. I. D. Bishop, Devon Regiment
Sapper J. Black, Royal Engineers
Pte. T.S. Blackbird, Yorkshire and Lancashire Regiment
L./C. W. Blackburn, Northumberland Fusiliers
Sgt. W. Blackley, Highland Light Infantry
Sgt. E. D. Blackman, London Regiment
Pte. H. Blackwell, King's Royal Rifle Corps
Cpl. R. Bland, Royal Engineers
Cpl. G. Bliss, 20th Hussars
Pte. J. Blower, Shropshire Light Infantry
Sgt. J. Blud, 1st Bn., Shropshire Light Infantry
Sgt. H. Boam, Royal Engineers
Sapper. T. Bogle, Royal Engineers
L./Sgt. C. A. Bonar, Welsh Guards
Pte. G. Bond, Northumberland Fusiliers
L./Sgt. H. Boneham, Coldstream Guards
L./C. H. F. H. Boon, Scots Guards
Sgt. B. Bourne, Yorkshire Light Infantry
L./C. H. T. Boyden, Middlesex Regiment
Pte. J. Boyle, Scots Guards
L./C. C. H. Bradford, Special Reserve
Pte. A. Bradley, East Kent Regiment
Pte. R. Bradshaw, East Yorkshire Regiment
Cpl. (Acting Sgt.) S. Braithwaite, Yorkshire Regiment.
Pte. J. Brammer, North Staffordshire Regiment
Pte. A. W. Branch, King's Royal Rifle Corps
Pte. M. Brannan, Yorkshire and Lancashire Regiment.
Cpl. T. Brayshaw, Royal Field Artillery
Sgt. J. Brennan, Irish Guards
Bombardier S. J. Brennan, Royal Garrison Artillery
Cpl. J. Brewin, Leicestershire Regiment
L./Sgt. G. H. Brittain, South Staffordshire Regiment
Sgt. A. C. Brixey, Royal Horse Artillery
L./Cpl. W. C. Brodie, Royal Warwickshire Regiment
Pte. J. Brodrick, Royal Scots Fusiliers
Cpl. W. Brome, Royal Field Artillery
Acting Bombardier J. Brook, Royal Field Artillery
Pte. G. W. Brookes, Shropshire Light Infantry
Sgt. F. H. Brooks, Royal Engineers
L./Sgt. W. F. Brooks, Worcestershire Regiment
Sgt. W. Broughton, West Yorkshire Regiment
Pte. A. Brown, Liverpool Regiment
Pte. F. Brown, West Yorkshire Regiment
Pte. G. Brown, Middlesex Regiment
Pte. W. H. Brown, Devon Regiment
Pte. W. H. Brown, Royal Highlanders
Sgt. A. E. Bryant, Royal West Surrey Regiment
Pte. J.Buchanan, Royal Highlanders
Sgt. C. J. Buckley, Lincolnshire Regiment
Gunner H. Buckley, Royal Field Artillery
Bombardier. A. E. Bull, Royal Field Artillery
Sgt. S. Bull, Royal Flying Corps
Flight Sgt. (Acting Sgt-Maj.) H. C. S. Bullock, Royal Flying Corps
Cpl. H. T. Bunn, Middlesex Regiment
Pte. A.A. Burgess, Rifle Brigade
Sgt. A.J. Burke, Liverpool Regiment
Acting Sgt. W. Burke, Grenadier Guards
Cpl. T. Burnett, Royal Field Artillery
L./C. (Acting 2nd Cpl.) C. J. Burrage, Royal Engineers
Sgt. (Acting Sgt-Maj.) W. G. Burt, Royal Artillery
Sgt. D. Burton, Army Service Corps
Sapper. G. F. Burton, Royal Engineers
2nd Cpl. H. Buttery, Royal Engineers
L./C. J. Buzzard, East Kent Regiment
Pte. F. Bydawell, Machine Gun Corps, late Shropshire Light Infantry
L./Sjt. W. H. Byrom, Cheshire Regiment
Pte. G. Cable, South Wales Borderers
Sgt. T. L. Cahill, Irish Guards
Sgt. F. Calder, Royal Engineers
Pte. G.Callan, King's Royal Rifle Corps
Cpl. H. Cameron, Cameron Highlanders
Pte. H. Cameron, Argyll and Sutherland Highlanders
Bugler T. G. Cameron, Durham Light Infantry
Sgt. D. Campbell, King's Own Scottish Borderers
L./C. J. Campbell, Argyll and Sutherland Highlanders
Drummer J. Campbell, Argyll and Sutherland Highlanders
Gunner E. W. Camping, Royal Horse Artillery
Cpl. C. Carr, Royal Field Artillery
Sapper H. Carr, Royal Engineers
Gunner W. Carr, Royal Field Artillery
Pte. M. Carroll, Royal Munster Fusiliers
Pte. W. Carter, West Riding Regiment
Pte. G. Casey, Worcestershire Regiment
Sjt. E. Catling, Yorkshire Regiment
Pte. A. Chalmers, Argyll and Sutherland Highlanders
Pte. E. Chambers, West Yorkshire Regiment
Gunner T. Chambers, Royal Garrison Artillery
L/C. A.W. Chaplin, Royal Inniskilling Fusiliers
Sgt. D. W. Chapman, Grenadier Guards
Pte. W. Chard, Scots Guards
Pte. E. Charlton, Durham Light Infantry
L./C. A.E. Charman, London Regiment
L./C. B. Chipchase, Northumberland Fusiliers
Pte. W. Church, Shropshire Light Infantry
Driver T. Churchill, Royal Field Artillery
Acting Sgt. W. B. Churchman, Royal Engineers
Pte. C.J. Claridge, Gloucestershire Regiment
Pte. A. F. Clark, Durham Light Infantry
Pte. T.F. Clark, Yorkshire Light Infantry
Sapper (Acting Sgt.) S. Clark, Royal Engineers
L./C. W. Clark, Machine Gun Corps, late West Yorkshire Regiment
Sgt. (Acting Staff Sgt-Maj.) W. J. Clark, Army Service Corps
Pte. W. S. Clark, London Regiment
Pte. A. Clarke, West Yorkshire Regiment
Cpl. F. Clarke, Yorkshire Light Infantry
L./C. F. C. Clarke, London Regiment
Bombardier. G. C. Clarke, Royal Field Artillery
Pte. J. Clarke, South Lancashire Regiment
Pte. J. Clarkson, Grenadier Guards
Cpl. T. Clayton, Irish Guards
B.Q.M.S. C. W. Cleaver, Royal Field Artillery
L./Sgt. S. Clegg, Manchester Regiment
L./C. W. V. Clements, 2nd Dragoon Guards
Cpl. J. Cochrane, Argyll and Sutherland Highlanders
Cpl. (Acting Mechanist Sgt.-Maj.) T. Cochrane, Army Service Corps
2nd Cpl. E. Coldman, Royal Engineers
Cpl. G. W. Cole, Royal Engineers
Pte. A. Coles, Welsh Regiment
Sgt. F. Coles, Royal Engineers
Pte. S. Coles, Dorset Regiment
Pte. G. Colgan, Royal Inniskilling Fusiliers
Gunner G. B. Collard, Royal Field Artillery
Gunner G. Collins, Royal Garrison Artillery
L./C. R. Collins, Norfolk Regiment
Sapper E.A. Collis, Royal Engineers
Sgt. W.H. Collis, Royal Engineers
L./C. A. E. Collison, Coldstream Guards
Acting. Bombardier W.H. Coltman, Royal Field Artillery
Cpl. W. H. Comery, Nottinghamshire and Derbyshire Regiment
Cpl. R. Connor, Highland Light Infantry
16224 Pte. G. Constable, Royal Army Medical Corps
Pte. A. E. Constant, Welsh Regiment
L./C. E. Cook, Royal Engineers
Company Q.M.S. W. R. Cook, South Wales Borderers
Sgt. S. Cooke, Grenadier Guards
Sgt. C. J. H. Cooper, Royal Engineers
Pte. J. W. Cooper, West Yorkshire Regiment
Cpl. W. S. Cooper, Grenadier Guards
 L./C. C. Corbett, Royal Scots
Pte. J. Corcoran, Grenadier Guards
Gunner J. Coulson, Royal Field Artillery
Cpl. A. Coulter, Royal Scots Fusiliers
Sgt. S. H. Covell, Royal Lancashire Regiment
Pte. A. Covill, Suffolk Regiment
Sgt. J. Cowan, Liverpool Regiment
Sgt. T. Cowan, Scottish Rifles
Acting Bombardier H. C. Coward, Royal Garrison Artillery
Gunner J. Cowgill, Royal Field Artillery
Sgt. J. Cowie, 3rd Coy. Royal Munster Fusiliers.
Pte. J. Cox, Grenadier Guards
Pte. P. H. Cox, London Regiment
Pte. S.Cox, Bedfordshire Regiment
Acting Bombardier J.F.B.Craig, Royal Field Artillery
Sapper W. Crank, Royal Engineers
Pte. R. Crate, Royal Scots Fusiliers
2nd Cpl. C. P. Creek, Royal Engineers
Sgt. J. H. Cribbin, Liverpool Regiment
Acting Sgt. W. Croghan, Royal Field Artillery
Cpl. E. Croll, Nottinghamshire and Derbyshire Regiment
Pte. W. G. Crossley, London Regiment
Pte. W. F. Crowe, Liverpool Regiment
L./C. A. Cullen, East Kent Regiment
Pte. J. Culnane, Army Service Corps
Pte. B. Cundy, Essex Regiment
Pte. J. H. Curtis, Nottinghamshire and Derbyshire Regiment
Sgt.(Acting Company Sgt-Maj.) J. H. Dale, Royal Irish Rifles
Gunner J. Daly, Royal Garrison Artillery
Gunner T. N. Darville, Royal Field Artillery
Bombardier W. J. Davey, Royal Field Artillery
Acting Bombardier D. Davies, Royal Field Artillery
Sgt. J. Davies, Welsh Regiment
Cpl. J. J. Davies, Royal Army Medical Corps
Pte. S. V. Davies, King's Royal Rifle Corps
Sgt. H. G. Davis, Royal Engineers
Cpl. (Acting Sgt.) S. J. Davis, Royal Engineers
Sgt. C. Davison, Royal Garrison Artillery
L./C. A. Day, Northumberland Fusiliers
Sgt. G. A. Day, Mounted Military Police
Acting Company Q.M.S. J. Day, Royal Scots
Sgt. W. T. Day, Royal Garrison Artillery.
Gunner E. E. Deacy, Royal Field Artillery
Sgt. A. Dearman, Yorkshire Regiment
Cpl. P. E. DeCarteret, Royal Field Artillery
Pte. J. Delaney, Royal Fusiliers
L./C. J. Dempsey, 5th Lancers
Pte. A. C. Dempster, Royal Irish Rifles
Gunner H. Denmark, Royal Garrison Artillery
L./C.T. Dennehy, Royal Munster Fusiliers
Sgt. A. H. Dennis, King's Royal Rifle Corps
Cpl. F. W. Denton, London Regiment
Acting Sgt. A. Dewar, Royal Highlanders
Sgt. C. Dickie, Gordon Highlanders
L./C. (Acting Cpl.) H. Digby, Essex Regiment
Sgt. T. Dillon, Somerset Light Infantry
Acting Bombardier. B. Divver, Royal Field Artillery
Pte. J. Dixon, Coldstream Guards
Cpl. K. Dobie, Gordon Highlanders
Cpl. G. Dobson, West Yorkshire Regiment
L./Sgt. H. Dobson, Royal Lancashire Regiment
Pte. R. J. Docking, Grenadier Guards
Pte. T. Dodd, South Lancashire Regiment
Sgt. W.R.Dodd, Yorkshire and Lancashire Regiment.
L./C. J. Dodds, Royal Scots Fusiliers
Acting. Sgt. R. N. Dodds, Royal Engineers
Sapper D. T. Dolby, Royal Engineers
Sgt. J. Donaldson, East Lancashire Regiment
Gunner J. J. Donoghue, Royal Garrison Artillery
Pte. W. Doody, Shropshire Light Infantry
Gunner J. Doran, Royal Field Artillery
Staff Q.M.S. F. W. Dorling, Army Service Corps
L./C. W. Dove, West Yorkshire Regiment
Sgt. W. Dowding, Durham Light Infantry
Sgt. G..W. F. H. Downer, Royal Horse Artillery
Pt. I. Downes, Royal Welch Fusiliers
Pte. E. Dowsing, Royal West Kent Regiment
Pte. F. Drage, Cambridgeshire Regiment
Cpl. F. Dress, Royal Army Medical Corps
Sgt. W. Duckett, Royal Engineers
Sgt. P. Duffy, West Yorkshire Regiment
Cpl. C. J. Duggins, Royal West Surrey Regiment
Sapper F. Dundas, Royal Engineers
Pte. G. H. Dunstone, Royal Army Medical Corps
Sgt. J. A. Dutton, Royal Inniskilling Fusiliers
Sapper J. H. Dyke, Royal Engineers
Cpl. J. J. Earp, Royal Field Artillery
Pte. T. Easey, Suffolk Regiment
L./C. J. East, Royal West Kent Regiment
Sgt. R. Eastham, Royal Army Medical Corps
Sgt. G. Easton, Highland Light Infantry
Trumpeter H. Eddington, Royal Field Artillery
Sgt. J. Edmonds, Somerset Light Infantry
L./C. A. H. Edwards, South Staffordshire Regiment
Sgt. C. J. Edwards, Royal Garrison Artillery
Sgt. J. Edwards, Seaforth Highlanders
Gunner (Acting Bombardier) J. Edwards, Royal Garrison Artillery
Sgt. W. D. Edwards, Rifle Brigade
Sgt. M. Elderkin, Royal West Surrey Regiment
Acting. Sgt. J. H. Elliott, West Yorkshire Regiment
Sgt. T. Elliott, 1st Royal Dragoons
Sgt. E. Ellis, Yorkshire Light Infantry
Pte. E. Ellis, Yorkshire Light Infantry
Sgt. F. Ellis, Royal Engineers
Cpl. W. Ellis, Royal Field Artillery
Pte. W. S. Ellison, Royal Welch Fusiliers
Sgt. P. M. Elton, Royal Engineers
Acting. Bombardier G. P. Emery, Royal Garrison Artillery
Sgt. J. R. Ennion, Suffolk Regiment
Gunner D. Evans, Royal Garrison Artillery
L./Sgt. D. J. Evans, South Lancashire Regiment
Acting Sgt. G. P. Evans, Royal Monmouthshire Royal Engineers
Pte. H. E. Evans, South Wales Borderers
L./C. T. W. Evans, Border Regiment
L./Sgt. W. O. Evans, Royal Welch Fusiliers
Pte. F. G. Everett, Norfolk Regiment
Sgt. C. W. Everiss, Worcestershire Regiment
Pte. W. J. Facer, Suffolk Regiment
Pte. F. J. Farmer, Royal Warwickshire Regiment
2nd Class Air Mechanic H. N. Farmer, Royal Flying Corps
L./C. P. Farrell, Royal Inniskilling Fusiliers
Sapper T. Farrelly, Royal Engineers
Sgt. F. J. Fawcett, Royal Engineers
Pte. M. Fay, Lancashire Fusiliers
Pte. W. Feast, Royal West Kent Regiment.
Cpl. W. E. Feldwick, Motor Machine Gun Service
Cpl. R. Fellows, York and Lancaster Regiment
Pte. H. E. Felsted, Royal Army Medical Corps
Pte. F. Fensome, Royal Army Medical Corps
Pte. E. Fenton, Grenadier Guards
Sgt. J. Ferguson, Royal Field Artillery
Pte. B. L. Ferris, London Regiment
Pte. (Acting Cpl.) T. F. Fido, Rifle Brigade
Spr. A. Fields, Royal Anglesey Royal Engineers
L./C. R. A. Filer, Royal Army Medical Corps
Pte. G. A. Finch, Middlesex Regiment
Pte. W. Finch, Hampshire Regiment
Sgt. G. W. Finlay, Gordon Highlanders
Bombardier R. Finlayson, Royal Field Artillery
Gunner J. P. Firth, Royal Field Artillery
Sgt. P. J. Fisher, Cheshire Regiment
L./C. W. Fisher, Middlesex Regiment
Gunner (Acting Bombardier) W. L. Fisher, Royal Field Artillery
L./C. C. B. Fitch, Northamptonshire Regiment
Sgt. P. Fleming, Cameron Highlanders.
Sapper R. Fletcher, Royal Engineers
L./C. J. Flowers, West Yorkshire Regiment
Sgt. F. H. Floyd, Royal Engineers
Sgt. J. Foley, Shropshire Light Infantry
Sgt. J. Forshaw, Royal Anglesey Royal Engineers
Sapper (Acting L./C.) F. C. Fovargue, Royal Engineers
Pte. R. Fowler, Border Regiment
Pte. F. Fox, East Surrey Regiment
Sgt. W. S. Fox, Royal Anglesey Royal Engineers
Acting. Sgt. W. G. Frampton, Royal Field Artillery
Acting. Sgt. J. France, Northumberland Fusiliers
Pte. D. Frank, Argyll and Sutherland Highlanders
Sgt. A. Fraser, Highland Light Infantry
Bombardier A. S. Fraser, Royal Field Artillery
Sgt. H. Fraser, Seaforth Highlanders
Pte. J. Fraser, Royal Army Medical Corps
Cpl. H. Fredman, Royal Field Artillery
Sgt. J. J. Freeman, South Wales Borderers
L./Sgt. J. S. Freeman, Northumberland Fusiliers
Cpl. J. French, King's Royal Rifle Company
Cpl. W. Frey, London Regiment
Acting Bombardier T. G. Fripp, Royal Field Artillery
Bombardier R.W.Frith, Royal Field Artillery
Cpl. T. P. Fry, London Regiment
Pte. T. J. Fulbrig, Royal Inniskilling Fusiliers
Cpl. A. Furnell, Wiltshire Regiment
Acting Bombardier J. Furnival, Royal Field Artillery
Company Q.M.S. S. Furzer, Border Regiment
Pte. P. W. Fussell, Liverpool Regiment
Sgt. G. Gardener, Durham Light Infantry
Sgt. W. Gardner, Royal Lancashire Regiment
Pte. G. Garvin, Royal Inniskilling Fusiliers
Pte. W. A. Gatenby, West Yorkshire Regiment
Pte. E. D. Gates, Coldstream Guards
Sgt. E. J. Gibbs, Welsh Guards
L./C. F. W. Gibson, London Regiment
Pte. E. F. Giles, Rifle Brigade
Pte. G.F. Gill, Royal West Surrey Regiment
Cpl. W. Gillin, Northumberland Fusiliers
Pte. E. Gisby, Border Regiment
Cpl. M. Glancy, Leinster Regiment
Staff Q.M.S (Acting Staff Sgt-Maj.) M. Glavey, Army Service Corps
Pte. A. Godfrey, Northamptonshire Regiment
Pte. J. Golding, Shropshire Light Infantry
Sgt. J. Goldthorpe, Royal West Surrey Regiment
L./Sgt. B. C. Goodchild, Suffolk Regiment
Sgt. J. Gordon, Royal Anglesey Royal Engineers
Cpl. G. Gosling, Royal Engineers
Cpl. D. Graham, Royal Field Artillery
L./Sgt. J..Graham, 2nd Dragoons
Sgt. G. H. Grant, Essex Regiment
Cpl. A. Grattan, Royal Garrison Artillery
Pte. A. Gray, York and Lancaster Regiment
2nd Class Air Mechanic A. J. Greatorex, Royal Flying Corps
Sapper E. Green, Royal Engineers
Pte. J. Green, South Staffordshire Regiment
Pte. D. Greens, Northumberland Fusiliers
Cpl. H. P. Greenwood, Special Reserve
Sgt. G. S. Gregory, Hertfordshire Regiment
Pioneer M. L. Greig, Royal Engineers
L./C. D. Grierson, Royal Highlanders
Sgt. L. B. Griffin, Oxfordshire & Buckinghamshire Light Infantry
Sgt. A. F. Grimble, Yorkshire Regiment
Cpl. A. H. Grimmitt, Royal Army Medical Corps
Pte. H. W. Grimwade, Essex Regiment
L./C. B. Grizell, 1st Dragoons
L./C. J. Gunn, Royal Inniskilling Fusiliers
Pte. T. Gutherie, Scots Guards
Gunner J. Hague, Royal Field Artillery
L./C. C. H. Hales, London Regiment
Pte. C. S. Hall, East Kent Regiment
Sgt. H. L. Hall, King's Royal Rifle Corps
Pte. J. E. Hall, Duke of Cornwall Light Infantry
Gunner J. W. Hall, Royal Field Artillery
Pte. W. J. Hall, Royal Army Medical Corps
Pte. J. Halleron, York and Lancaster Regiment
Sgt. B.. J. Halliday, Lincolnshire Regiment
Cpl. F. Halliday, East Surrey Regiment
Sgt. D. Hallinan, Dorset Regiment
Pte. C. Hambling, West Yorkshire Regiment
Sgt. D. Hamilton, King's Own Scottish Borderers
Sgt. W. E. Hampe, Lincolnshire Regiment
Sgt. H. W. Hamshaw, Worcestershire Regiment
Pte. S. F. Hancock, Gloucestershire Regiment
Cpl. H. F. Hancocks, Northumberland Fusiliers
Cpl. (Acting Sgt.) T. P. Hands, Royal Warwickshire Regiment
L./C. W. C. Hands, London Regiment
Cpl. A. K. Handy, Royal Field Artillery
Pte. D. T. Hanford, Rifle Brigade
Cpl. T. O. Hann, Durham Light Infantry
 L./Sgt. J. Happell, Highland Light Infantry
Pte. T. W. Hardcastle, Northumberland Fusiliers
Acting Sgt. J. Harding, 4th Dragoons Guards
L./C. J. H. Harding, Royal West Surrey Regiment
Cpl. T. P. Hardman, Royal Scots Fusiliers.
Cpl. A. Hardy, Nottinghamshire and Derbyshire Regiment
Sgt. (Acting Company Sgt-Maj) R.R Hare, Liverpool Regiment
L./C. S. Hargreaves, King's Own Scottish Borderers
Cpl. A. J. Harrington, Worcestershire Regiment
Pte. A. V. Harris, King's Royal Rifle Corps
Sapper C. Harris, Royal Engineers
Cpl. W. Harris, Leicestershire Regiment
Pte. W. H. Harris, London Regiment
Pte. T. J. Harrison, Royal Irish Rifles
Pte. W. G. Harrison, Yorkshire Regiment
2nd Cpl. (Acting Cpl.) H. C. Hart, Royal Engineers
Sgt. H. Hartley, West Riding Regiment
Cpl. R. Hartley, West Riding Regiment
L./C. J. B. Hartnup, Royal West Surrey Regiment
Cpl. L. Haslett, Royal Inniskilling Fusiliers
L./C. H. Hastings, East Surrey Regiment
Pte. G. F. Hawkins, Royal Fusiliers
Pte. H. Hawkins, 12th Lancers
Pte. P. Hayes, North Staffordshire Regiment
Cpl. S. Hayter, Rifle Brigade
Sgt. J. H. A. Hayward, Royal Engineers
L./C. W. Hazell, Royal Warwickshire Regiment
Sgt D. T. Hazlehurst, York and Lancaster Regiment
Pte. W. Heafield, York and Lancaster Regiment
Pte. P. Heath, Yorkshire Light Infantry
Cpl. F. A. Hedley, 40th Divisional Artillery
L./C. (Acting Staff Sgt.) A. S. Henderson, Army Veterinary Corps
Pte. B. Hendry, Highland Light Infantry
Pte. W. Henry, Nottinghamshire and Derbyshire Regiment
Sgt. H. E. Henson, Yorkshire Light Infantry
Pte. C. Herring, Shropshire Light Infantry
Pte. H. Herring, Middlesex Regiment
Pte. B. W. Hewitt, Army Service Corps
L./C. J. Hewitt, Leicestershire Regiment
Pte. P. Hext, Royal Welch Fusiliers
Sgt. C. Heywood, South Lancashire Regiment
Sgt. F. H. C. Hickman, London Regiment
Sgt. W. T. Hicks, Grenadier Guards
L./C. M. Higgins, Irish Guards
Bombardier T. H. Hill, Royal Garrison Artillery
Sapper H. W. Hills, Royal Engineers
Sgt. G. Hilton, Cameron Highlanders
Sgt. J.F.Hind, Royal Army Medical Corps
L./C. A. Hinett, Nottinghamshire and Derbyshire Regiment
Driver C. Hinsley, Royal Field Artillery
Cpl. J. H. Hinvest, 1st Dragoon Guards
Pte. W. C. Histed, East Kent Regiment
Cpl. G. Hodder, Royal Field Artillery
Cpl. R. Hodgkinson, West Riding Regiment
Pte. G. H. Hodgson, West Yorkshire Regiment
Cpl. W. Hofman, Middlesex Regiment
Pte. A. Hogarth, Northumberland Fusiliers
Drummer H. Hogwood, London Regiment
Sgt. W. M. Holden, Liverpool Regiment
Pioneer A. Holiday, Royal Engineers
Pte. G. Hollinrake, Royal Lancashire Regiment
2nd Cpl. F. J. Holman, Royal Engineers
L./C. D. Holmes, Worcestershire Regiment
Pte. S. Holmes, Yorkshire Regiment
Pte. (Acting L./C.) H. A. Holt, Royal Army Medical Corps
Sgt. C. W. Hood, Yorkshire Light Infantry
L./C. (Acting 2nd Cpl.) H. Hood, Royal Engineers
Pte. J. Hopcraft, Royal Fusiliers
L./C. A. Horcroft, Royal Sussex Regiment
L./Sgt. J. Hordern, Special Reserve
L./Sgt. T. Horlock, Machine Gun Service
Sgt. E. M. Horner, Royal Engineers
Pte. (Acting Sgt.) G. Horsley, Army Service Corps
Sgt. H. Houghton, London Regiment
L./C. E. Houston, Royal Scots
Acting Sgt. A.R.Howard, Royal Field Artillery
L./C. H. Howard, Northamptonshire Regiment
Acting Sgt. W. M. Howard, Royal Field Artillery
Sgt. (Acting Staff Sgt-Maj.) E. V. Howes, Army Service Corps
L./Sgt. J. Howley, West Yorkshire Regiment
Pte. J. Hoy, Suffolk Regiment
Pte. F. Hughes, Royal Sussex Regiment
Bombardier P. Hughes, Royal Field Artillery
Pte. W. Hull, South Lancashire Regiment
Acting Company Sgt-Maj. F. Hullott, Lincolnshire Regiment
Sgt. A. M. Humphreys, Royal Engineers
Pte. H.J. Humphries, Gloucestershire Regiment
2nd Cpl. (Acting Cpl.) J. Hunter, Royal Engineers
Gunner J. H. Huntley, Royal Field Artillery
Pte. W. Huntriss, Royal Lancashire Regiment
Cpl. H. Hurd, Royal Garrison Artillery
Sgt. E. W. Hurst, Royal Engineers
Pte. A. Huson, London Regiment
L./C. P. Hussey, Northamptonshire Regiment
Cpl. J. Hutcheson, Scottish Rifles
Acting. 2nd Cpl. R. Hutchinson, Royal Engineers
L./C. A. C. Ingamells, Lincolnshire Regiment
Sgt. P. Inman, York and Lancaster Regiment
Sgt. H. Irle, Royal Field Artillery
Pte. G. Ironmonger, Grenadier Guards
Sgt. G. Irving, Manchester Regiment
Pte. R. Irwin, Royal Inniskilling Fusiliers
Cpl. C. Iveson, Northumberland Fusiliers
L./C. A. Jackson, Nottinghamshire and Derbyshire Regiment
Pte. E. B. Jackson, Royal Fusiliers
Gunner G. W. Jackson, Royal Garrison Artillery
L./C. J. T. Jackson, Northamptonshire Regiment
Sgt. S. Jackson, Manchester Regiment
Pte. A. M. Jaffray, Gordon Highlanders
Flight Sgt. (Acting Sgt-Maj.) H. James, Royal Flying Corps
Gunner J. R. Jarman, Royal Field Artillery
Cpl. A. Jarvis, Royal Engineers
Gunner E. Jeffery, Royal Horse Artillery
Bombardier E. G. Jenkins, Royal Field Artillery
Gunner J. Jenkins, Royal Garrison Artillery
L./C. B. J. Jenks, Lincolnshire Regiment
L./C. P. Jennings, Oxfordshire and Buckinghamshire Light Infantry
Pte. G. W. Jenrick, East Kent Regiment
Sgt. N. Jensen, Royal Engineers
Sgt. F. Johnson, Nottinghamshire and Derbyshire Regiment
Pte. F. Johnson, West Riding Regiment
Pte. G. Johnson, Royal Army Medical Corps
Pte. J. Johnston, Middlesex Regiment
Pte. R. Johnstone, Manchester Regiment
Sgt. C. Jones, King's Own Scottish Borderers
Sgt. D. A. Jones, Welch Regiment
Sgt. G. P. Jones, Royal Welch Fusiliers
Sapper J. Jones, Royal Anglesey Royal Engineers
Flight Sgt. (Acting Sgt-Maj.) J. C. Jones, Royal Flying Corps
Cpl. J. R. Jones, Somerset Light Infantry
Sgt. R. Jones, Royal Welch Fusiliers
L./C. S. Jones, Welsh Regiment
Sgt. W.J. Jones, Royal Engineers
Cpl. A. H. S. Joyce, Bedfordshire Regiment
Sapper H. Kandes, Royal Engineers
Flight Sgt. (Acting Sgt/Maj.) M. Keegan, Royal Flying Corps
Pte. D. Kelleher, Irish Guards
Cpl. E. E. Kelly, Royal Garrison Artillery
Pte. J. E. Kelly, Royal Warwickshire Regiment
Gunner T. Kelly, Royal Field Artillery
Gunner A. R. Kelsey, Royal Field Artillery
Sgt. C. Kemp, Royal West Surrey Regiment
Gunner D. Kempner, Royal Field Artillery
Sgt. R. Kendall, Welsh Regiment
Pte. T. Kenny, North Staffordshire Regiment
Pte. W. Kent, King's Royal Rifle Company
L./C. J. Kenyon, East Surrey Regiment
Sgt. H. W. Kernott, Royal Fusiliers
Cpl. T. W. Keskeys, Royal Engineers
Gunner A. C. Kidd, Royal Field Artillery
Cpl. (Acting Sgt.) A. King, Shropshire Light Infantry
Sgt. J. P. King, Bedfordshire Regiment
Bombardier P. J. King, Royal Field Artillery
Pte. W. Kingsford, East Kent Regiment
Pte. A. A. Kirchin, Leicestershire Regiment
Cpl. W. E. Kisby, Royal Scots
L./C. H. Knight, Royal Army Medical Corps
Pte. R. W. Knight, Rifle Brigade
L./C. J. T. Knott, Leicestershire Regiment
Engh. Clerk Q.M.S. W. Knott, Royal Engineers
Sgt. J. Knowles, Nottinghamshire and Derbyshire Regiment
Sgt. T. Knox, Northumberland Fusiliers
L./.C. W. H. Lacey, Nottinghamshire and Derbyshire Regiment
L./C. A. Lancaster, Bedfordshire Regiment
4409 Sgt. H. Lancaster, Royal Lancashire Regiment
L./C. J. Lang, King's Royal Rifle Company
Pte. F. Langdon, Royal Welch Fusiliers
L./C. T. Langford, Royal Engineers
Cpl. G. Larby, Royal Sussex Regiment
Cpl. J. Larkman, King's Royal Rifle Company
Pte. W. R. Laskey, Durham Light Infantry
Sgt. R. J. Lawler, Suffolk Regiment
L./C. (Acting Cpl.) P. Layton, Shropshire Light Infantry
Pte. W Layton, Shropshire Light Infantry
Cpl. W. W. Leach, Royal Engineers
Pte. J. Leary, South Staffordshire Regiment
Pte. T. Leatham, Royal Highlanders
Pte. J. W. Ledger, York and Lancaster Regiment
Cpl. C. Lee, Royal Field Artillery
Pte. J.W. Lee, Lincolnshire Regiment
Pte. F. Leiper, Highland Light Infantry
Pte. T. Leslie, East Lancashire Regiment
Pte. H. E. Lester, South Staffordshire Regiment
Pte. F. Lewis, Cameron Highlanders
Pte. F. Ling, Norfolk Regiment
Gunner S. Lisle, Royal Field Artillery
Pte. W. Lisney, Gloucestershire Regiment
Flight Sgt. (Acting Sgt/Maj.) C. Littlejohn, Royal Flying Corps
L./C. W. Livesey, Royal Lancaster Regiment
Pte. B. Livett, Royal Berkshire Regiment
Sgt. W. Lloyd, Worcestershire Regiment
Pte. W. E. Lloyd, Royal Army Medical Corps
Sgt. J. W. Lockwood, Royal Army Medical Corps
2nd Cpl. T. M. Logan, Royal Engineers
Pte. C. L. Long, Essex Regiment
Pte. C. Looney, Royal Munster Fusiliers
Pte. F. H. Loring, Yorkshire Light Infantry
Acting Company Sgt./Maj. G. Lovatt, Highland Light Infantry
2nd Cpl. (Acting Cpl.) W. R. Lovell, Royal Engineers
Pte. W. A. Luck, Northamptonshire Regiment
L./Sgt. W. Lunn, North Staffordshire Regiment
L./C. A. MacBeath, Seaforth Highlanders
Pte. D. Macintosh, Highland Light Infantry
Pte. D. MacKay, Seaforth Highlanders
Cpl. J. S. MacMurchie, Royal Highlanders
L./C. F. G. Madeley, Grenadier Guards
Sgt. A. J. Mackenzie, Royal Fusiliers
Sapper D. Maclean, Royal Engineers
L./C. S. J. Maclean, North Staffordshire Regiment
Cpl. F. Mahan, Nottinghamshire and Derbyshire Regiment
Cpl. P. Mahon, Leinster Regiment
Sgt. J. Mahony, Royal Irish Fusiliers
Pte. P. Mallea, Army Service Corps
Staff Sgt. (Acting Staff Sgt./Maj.) F. C. Manley, Army Service Corps
L./C. J. Mant, Royal Sussex Regiment
Sgt. F. Markham, 18th Hussars
Gunner W. Markham, Royal Field Artillery
Gunner C. W. Marler, Royal Field Artillery
Sgt. W. Marley, Royal Army Medical Corps
Sgt. A. H. Marsh, Durham Light Infantry
Sgt. J. Marshall, Royal Engineers
Pte. J. Marston, Shropshire Light Infantry
Pte. H. W. Martin, Middlesex Regiment
L./Sgt. T. Martin, Nottinghamshire and Derbyshire Regiment
L./C. W. E. Martin, Royal Sussex Regiment
Acting Sgt. E. J. Marygold, Nottinghamshire and Derbyshire Regiment
L./C. E. Mason, King's Royal Rifle Company
Pte. L. Mason, East Kent Regiment
Cpl. R. Mathieson, King's Own Scottish Borderers
L./C. S. Matthews, Nottinghamshire and Derbyshire Regiment
Sgt. J. H. Mattinson, Oxfordshire and Buckinghamshire Light Infantry
Actin. Bombardier T. W. Mattox, Royal Field Artillery
Gunner T. Mavin, Royal Garrison Artillery
Sgt. J. C. May, London Regiment
Sgt. H.V. May, Royal Engineers
Gunner D. McAlden, Royal Field Artillery
Pte. J. McAnary, Royal Inniskiling Fusiliers
L./C. S. McBurnie, Depot, King's Own Scottish Borderers
Cpl. D. McCarthy, Royal Garrison Artillery
Cpl. G. McCarthy, Duke of Cornwall's Light Infantry
Cpl. E. G. McCartney, Royal Garrison Artillery
Sgt. F. C. McClelland, Royal Engineers
2nd Cpl. (Acting. Cpl.) W. J. McCoy, Royal Engineers
Sgt. D. McCormack, Royal Munster Fusiliers
Sgt. J. McCrae, Argyll & Sutherland Highlanders
2nd. Cpl. (Acting Cpl.) J. McCreath, Royal Engineers
Sgt. J. McDermott, King's Own Scottish Borderers
Sgt. J. T. McDonagh, Coldstream Guards
Pte. A. McDonald, East Kent Regiment
L./C. C. McDonald, Special Reserve
Cpl. A. McEwan, Royal Field Artillery
Cpl. A. McGough, Gordon Highlanders
Gunner M. Mclnnes, Royal Field Artillery
Pte. J. Mclntyre, Highland Light Infantry
Pte. T. McKenna, Northumberland Fusiliers
L./C. A. McLean, Royal Engineers
2nd Cpl. (Acting Cpl.) A. McLeod, Royal Engineers
Pte. R. McNab, Seaforth Highlanders
Pte. J. McPhail, Argyll and Sutherland Highlanders
Pte. J. McQuade, Northumberland Fusiliers
Pte. A. W. Mead, London Regiment
Sgt. F. J. Mead, Royal Garrison Artillery
L./C. J. Meadows, Essex Regiment
Sgt. J. Millar, Royal Highlanders
Staff Sgt. H. Miller, Royal Army Medical Corps
Pte. W. Miller, South Lancashire Regiment
Pte. F. Millett, London Regiment
Sapper T. J. Millett, Royal Engineers
L./C. J. F. Mills, London Regiment
Farrier Staff Sgt. S. Mills, Indian Army
Pte. W. C. Millward, South Wales Borderers
L./C. A. Milnes, Coldstream Guards
Sgt. J. Minnery, Argyll and Sutherland Highlanders
Cpl. A. Mitchell, Royal Engineers
Gunner A. Mitchell, Royal Field Artillery
Gunner C. A. Mitchell, Royal Field Artillery
Pte. G. Mitchell, York and Lancaster Regiment
Sapper A. Moncho, Royal Engineers
Cpl. (Acting Sgt.) W. Monteith, Royal Engineers
Sgt. J. R. Moorhouse, King's Own Scottish Borderers
Gunner W. Moreman, Royal Field Artillery
Pte. W. J. Morgan, South Wales Borderers
Acting Sgt. W. Morley, Duke of Cornwall's Light Infantry
L./C. F. S. Morris, Royal Engineers
Pte. H. Morris, Duke of Cornwall's Light Infantry
L./C. G. Morris, 6th Bn., Northamptonshire Regiment
Sgt. (Acting Battery Sgt-Maj.) W. H. Morris, Royal Field Artillery
L./C. T. Morrisey, Leinster Regiment
Sgt. A. C. Mousley, Royal Field Artillery
Sgt. P. Moyles, Yorkshire Light Infantry
Sgt. J. Muir, Scots Guards
Pte. J. Muirhead, Scots Guards
Driver A. Murgatroyd, Royal Field Artillery
Pte. A. Murray, Shropshire Light Infantry
Sgt. W. Murray, Royal Highlanders
Pte. W. H. Murray, West Riding Regiment
Acting Company Q.M.S. London Regiment
L./C. W. Neale, Grenadier Guards
L./C. R. Neilson, Scottish Rifles
Acting Sgt. A. Nelson, Northumberland Fusiliers
Sgt. E. Newman, Royal Engineers
L./Sgt. J. Newman, London Regiment
Pte. G. E. Newton, York and Lancaster Regiment
Pte. A. Neville, Northamptonshire Regiment
Pte. F. A. Newey, Royal Warwickshire Regiment
Pte. T. Nisbett, Royal Lancaster Regiment
Pte. G. A. M. Noble, Durham Light Infantry
Cpl. W. P. Noel, Royal Field Artillery
Sgt. M. Nolan, Royal Army Medical Corps
Sgt. W. M. Nolan, Royal Field Artillery
Cpl. J. Norcross, Royal Field Artillery
L/C. J. R. Norman, North Staffordshire Regiment
Acting Cpl. R; Norman, Northamptonshire Regiment
Cpl. G. H. Norton, Suffolk Regiment
Cpl. A. Nunn, Royal Engineers
L./Sgt. G. Oakes, Nottinghamshire and Derbyshire Regiment
L./C. J. O'Brien, Royal Dublin Fusiliers
Cpl. M. O'Brien, Royal Munster Fusiliers
L./C. P. O'Brien, Royal Dublin Fusiliers
Pte. E. H. Obstfelder, Middlesex Regiment
Pte. J. W. Offler, Royal Sussex Regiment
Pte. J. O'Gorman, Royal Munster Fusiliers
Cpl. H. M. O'Hare, Royal Field Artillery
Pte. P. G. O'Keefe, 10th Hussars
Sgt. D. O'Leary, King's Royal Rifle Company
Sapper. W. Olner, Royal Engineers
Pte. L. J. O'Mara, Royal West Surrey Regiment
Sgt. A. Orange, West Yorkshire Regiment
Pte. P. O'Reilly, King's Own Scottish Borderers
Pte. (Acting L./C.) J. J. P. O'Rorke, Royal Munster Fusiliers
L./Sgt. R. Orr, Royal Scottish Fusiliers
Gunner R. T. Orsmond, Royal Garrison Artillery
Q.M.S. (acting Staff Sgt/Maj.) F. A. Osborn, Royal Scots Fusiliers
Gunner W. G. Osborne, Motor Machine-gun Service
Bandsman A. V. Owen, Worcestershire Regiment
L./C. W. Paddock, Royal Engineers
Cpl. (Acting Sgt.) W. K. Palmer, Royal Engineers
Sapper G. Park, Royal Engineers
Cpl. J. F. Parker, Royal Garrison Artillery
Pte. J. S. Parkinson, Liverpool Regiment
Cpl. W. H. Parrett, Royal Garrison Artillery
Cpl. A. E. Parrott, Royal Field Artillery
Sgt. A. K. Paterson, Rifle Brigade
Pte. L. Patterson, Royal Army Medical Corps
Sgt. R. Paxton, Gordon Highlanders
Cpl. of Horse C.H. Pay, 2nd Life Guards
Acting Bombardier. G. Peacock, Royal Field Artillery
Sapper S. Pearce, Royal Engineers
Cpl. J. Peat, Royal Garrison Artillery
Cpl. H. Pegg, Durham Light Infantry
Pte. E. W. Penson, Royal Warwickshire Regiment
Acting Cpl. O. J. Perry, Middlesex Regiment
L./C. P. Perry, Essex Regiment
L./Sgt. T. Phillipson, Cheshire Regiment
Pte. J. Pickavance, South Lancashire Regiment
Sapper J. Pickering, Royal Engineers
Sgt. H. B. Pigott, Royal Field Artillery
Pte. W. E. Pitney, 9th Lancers
Cpl. T. A. Plant, King's Royal Rifle Company
Sgt. A. Plunkett, Royal Engineers
Sgt. H. Plunkett, London Regiment
Sgt. H. Pobjoy, Royal Field Artillery
Pte. E. A. Polin, Royal Welsh Fusiliers
Staff Q.M.S. (Acting Staff Sgt/Maj.) T. Pollock, Army Service Corps
Sgt. W. Pollock, Royal Engineers
Pte. F. Poole, Gloucestershire Regiment
Pte. (Acting Sgt.) F. Pope, Shropshire Regiment
Sgt. E. Porter, East Yorkshire Regiment
L /C. H. Porter, York and Lancaster Regiment
10724 Sgt. W. J. Porter, Royal Fusiliers
Gunner (Acting Bombardier) J. L. Potter, Royal Field Artillery
Pte. W. Pounceby, South Lancashire Regiment
Pte. G. Powell, Monmouthshire Regiment
L./S. E. Powis, West Riding Regiment
Sgt. B. Pratten, South Wales Borderers
Sgt. H. Price, Grenadier Guards
Pte. N. Price, Royal Welch Fusiliers
Acting Sgt. W. E. Price, Royal Field Artillery
Q.M.S. W. C. Prince, Royal Army Medical Corps
Sgt. H. Proctor, North Staffordshire Regiment
Acting Sgt. D. Proudfoot, Royal Scots Fusiliers
Pte. A. H. W. Pullen, Rifle Brigade
Sgt. G. H. Pye, Royal Fusiliers
Sgt. E. Quince, Bedfordshire Regiment
Pte. P. Quinn, South Wales Borderers
L./C. A. Raggett, King's Royal Rifle Company
Pte. J. Railton, Northumberland Fusiliers
L./C. A. Ramage, Highland Light Infantry
Cpl. (Acting Sgt.) G. Rankin, Royal Engineers
Pte. J.W. Ravenhill, Devon Regiment
Cpl. (Acting Sgt.) T. Rayner, Middlesex Regiment
Pte. P.Read, Leinster Regiment
Cpl. E. L. Redman, London Regiment
L./C. G. Reed, Essex Regiment
Pte. H. V. Rees, Welsh Regiment
Engineer Clerk Q.M.S. P. R. Regan, Royal Engineers
Pte. P. C. Rex, Royal Dublin Fusiliers
Sapper A. Reynolds, Royal Engineers
Sgt. A. Rhoades, King's Royal Rifle Company
Pte. J. R. Rice, South Wales Borderers
Cpl. A. E. Richards, London Regiment
Pte. G. H. Richards, Border Regiment
Pte. J. Richardson, Northumberland Fusiliers
Pte. T. Richardson, East Yorkshire Regiment
Cpl. W. Richardson, London Regiment
Sgt. H. Richmond, Royal Field Artillery
L./C. W. Riddick, Manchester Regiment
Pte. J. Rigby, Lancashire Regiment
L./C. J. W. Rigby, Royal Monmouthshire Royal Engineers
Pte. J. Rimmer, King's Own Scottish Borderers
Cpl. A. Roabuck, Royal Irish Fusiliers
Sgt. (Acting Sgt-Maj.) E. Roberts, Royal Welsh Fusiliers
Gunner E. Roberts, Royal Garrison Artillery
Sgt. J. W. Roberts, Royal Garrison Artillery
Sgt. T. Roberts, Shropshire Light Infantry
Pte. W. Roberts, North Staffordshire Regiment
Acting Cpl. W. A. Roberts, Royal Field Artillery
Pte. A. Robertson, Royal Scots Fusiliers
L./C. E. Robins, Royal Engineers
L./C. A. H. Robinson, Bedfordshire Regiment
L./C. J. Robinson, Durham Light Infantry
Sgt. A. H. Robson, Royal Army Medical Corps
Cpl. F. F. Robson, Coldstream Guards
Pte. W. J. Robson, Gordon Highlanders
Pte. F. Rockett, East Yorkshire Regiment
Sgt. H. R. M. Rodman, Royal Army Medical Corps
Pte. P. Roe, Royal Dublin Fusiliers
Pte. A. G. Rose, 3rd Hussars
Pte. A. McK. Ross, Army Service Corps
Pte. D. N. Ross, Cameron Highlanders
L./C. F. Rosser, Royal Welsh Fusiliers
Pte. J. Rourke, Northumberland Fusiliers
Bombardier G. A. McL. Routledge, Royal Field Artillery
Sgt. (Acting Staff Sgt-Maj.) F. Rowe, Army Service Corps
Farrier Staff Sgt. W. Rowland, Royal Field Artillery
Sgt. L. M. Rudge, Grenadier Guards
Cpl. W. J. Rule, East Surrey Regiment
Sgt. E. J. Runyeard, Royal Engineers
Cpl. W. J. Rushforth, Royal Engineers
Bombardier A. J. Russell, Royal Field Artillery
L./Sgt. F. G. Russell, Bedfordshire Regiment
Sapper (Acting L./C.) F. J. Russell, Royal Engineers
Sapper T. Russell, Royal Engineers
Sgt. A. M. Ruston, Northamptonshire Regiment
Acting Bombardier J.W. Ryan, Royal Field Artillery
Pte. W. Ryan, Leinster Regiment
Bombardier. E. A. Sampson, Royal Field Artillery
3279 Gunner M. Samuels, Royal Garrison Artillery
Sgt. F. C. Sanders, Shropshire Light Infantry
Sgt. R. Sangster, Royal Scots
Acting L./C. R. Saunders, Royal Engineers
Gunner S. F. Saunders, Royal Garrison Artillery
Sgt. F. G. Sawyer, Royal Field Artillery
Cpl. C. Saysell, King's Royal Rifle Company
Gunner W. Schofield, Royal Field Artillery
L./Sgt. J. Scott, Seaforth Highlanders
Pte. J. R. Scott, Royal Army Medical Corps
Pte. T. N. G. Scott, Royal Army Medical Corps
L./Sgt. D. Seath, Cameron Highlanders
Bombardier T. Seddon, Royal Field Artillery
L./Sgt. T. Seed, North Lancashire Regiment
Pte. J. W. Sellars, Yorkshire Light Infantry
Pte. H. Selvey, Border Regiment
Pte. W. Shandley, Royal Army Medical Corps
Acting Bombardier J. Shannon, Royal Horse Artillery
Cpl. G. W. Shaw, Lincolnshire Regiment
Sgt. J. Shaw, Northumberland Fusiliers
Sgt. J. T. Shee, Royal Army Medical Corps
Sgt. J. T. Shepherd, Royal Engineers
Sgt. (Acting-Sgt-Maj.) J. B. Sherrington, Royal Garrison Artillery
Pte. H. J. Shewan, Royal Highlanders
Pte. S. Shone, Royal Highlanders
Sgt. H. Short, East Yorkshire Regiment
Pte. J. M. Showell, London Regiment
Sgt. W. Shrubsole, Royal Garrison Artillery
Sgt. (Acting Staff Sgt-Maj.) F. V. Sibbald, Army Service Corps
Acting Bombardier E. Silver, Royal Field Artillery
Cpl. W. A. Simmonds, Royal Fusiliers
Actg. L./C. H. J. Simmons, Royal Army Medical Corps
Pte. J. Simms, Royal Irish Rifles
Pte. H. H. Simpson, Nottinghamshire and Derbyshire Regiment
Pte. J. Simpson, Scots Guards
Bombardier W. R. Simpson, Royal Field Artillery
Pte. C. Sims, Royal Army Medical Corps
L./C. C. H. Slade, Seaforth Highlanders
Gunner J. Slater, Royal Field Artillery
Sgt. P. Smart, Scots Guards
Pte. T.M.Small, Royal Munster Fusiliers
Pte. H. L. Smedley, London Regiment
Sgt. G. Smewin, Oxfordshire and Buckinghamshire Light Infantry
Sgt. A. Smith, Lancashire Fusiliers
Sgt. A. E. Smith, Royal Garrison Artillery
L./C. C. W. Smith, King's Royal Rifle Company
Cpl. D. Smith, Seaforth Highlanders
Pte. F. Smith, Leinster Regiment
Sgt. G. Smith, Gordon Highlanders
Cpl. G. D. Smith, East Yorkshire Regiment
Staff Q.M.S. G. N. C. Smith, Army Service Corps
Driver G.W. Smith, Royal Field Artillery
Pte. H. Smith, Border Regiment
Bombardier J. F. Smith, Royal Field Artillery
Pte. J. W. Smith, Royal Scots
Sgt. R. W. Smith, Royal Army Medical Corps
Sgt. S. Smith, Norfolk Regiment
Pte. T. Smith, Gordon Highlanders
L./C. (Acting Sgt.) W. Smith, King's Royal Rifle Company
Pte. W. Smith, Rifle Brigade
Sgt. W. H. Smith, East Yorkshire Regiment
Cpl. W. J. Smithers, Royal Engineers
Sgt. G. Snell, Royal Horse Artillery
Sgt. T. Sockett, Northumberland Fusiliers
Sgt. F. J. Soper, Lincolnshire Regiment
Pte. W. M. Soutar, Gordon Highlanders
Armt. S./Sgt. (Actg. Armt. Sgt-Maj.) O. F. Sparey, Army Ordnance Corps
Sgt. J. W. Spencer, London Regiment
Cpl. R. Spencer, Royal Engineers
Sgt. G. P. Spooner, London Regiment
Sgt. W. E. Stanton, West Yorkshire Regiment
Gunner H. C. Staunton, Royal Field Artillery
Pte. A. W. D. Steele, Seaforth Highlanders
Cpl. (Acting Sgt.) E. Stevens, Royal Fusiliers
Sgt. G. Stevens, Lincolnshire Regiment
Cpl. S. F. Stevens, Royal Fusiliers
Pte. J. Stewart, Northumberland Fusiliers
Gunner W. C. Stiff, Royal Field Artillery
Sgt. G. Stinson, East Lancashire Regiment
L./C. R. Stitt, King's Own Scottish Borderers
Sgt. A. Stocking, London Regiment
Sgt. W. H. Stockwell, Royal Welsh Fusiliers
Drummer J. E. Stokes, Worcestershire Regiment
Pte. W. J. Stonier, Coldstream Guards
Sgt. A. Storry, Royal Engineers
Gunner C. G. Street, Royal Garrison Artillery
Pte. A. Stuart, South Lancashire Regiment
Sgt T. R. Summerhayes, Somerset Light Infantry
L./C. J. Summers, Royal Engineers
Sgt. J. Summerville, Durham Light Infantry
Bombardier T. S. Swain, Royal Garrison Artillery
Pte. D. Swan, Royal Highlanders
Sgt. W. H. Sweet, Mounted Military Police
Sgt. J. Sykes, Yorkshire Light Infantry
Pte. J. Taggart, Argyll and Sutherland Highlanders
L./C. A. W. Taylor, Shropshire Light Infantry
Sgt. G. Taylor, Grenadier Guards
Pte. H. Taylor, Rifle Brigade
Sgt. H. G. Taylor, Highland Light Infantry.
Pte. L. Teal, Shropshire Light Infantry
L./Sgt. G. Tedstill, Northumberland Fusiliers
Cpl. F. Thackray, York and Lancaster Regiment
Pte. E. Thomas, London Regiment
Pte. G. A. Thomas, South Wals Borderers
Sgt. H. J. Thomas, Grenadier Guards
L./C. J. Thompson, Yorkshire Light Infantry
Sgt. J. F. Thompson, London Regiment
L./C. (Acting Cpl.) R. J. S. Thorpe-Tracey, London Regiment
Cpl. P. J. Tickle, London Regiment
Sgt. G. Tidd, Norfolk Regiment
Bombardier G. W. Timmins, Royal Field Artillery
Cpl. J. H. Timson, Royal Engineers
Pte. W. Titt, Grenadier Guards
Sgt. H. Todd, Argyll and Sutherland Highlanders
Sgt J. Toomey, East Lancashire Regiment
Cpl. E. Toon, Leicestershire Yeomanry
Company Q.M.S. W. Tootill, South Wales Borderers
Sgt. W. J. Trigg, East Kent Regiment
Sgt. S. Tucker, London Regiment
Driver W. Tull, Royal Field Artillery
Pte. A. Turnbull, Liverpool Regiment
Pte. A. E. Turner, East Surrey Regiment
Pte. D. Turner, Border Regiment
Sgt. H. J. Turner, Royal Berkshire Regiment
Acting Bombardier J. W. Turton, Royal Field Artillery
Sgt. J. W. Tutt, Royal Sussex Regiment
Cpl. R. Twentymen, Northamptonshire Regiment
L./Sgt. F. Twist, 3rd Dragoon Guards.
Pte. P. Tyrrell, Royal Munster Fusiliers
Pte. A. Underhill, Army Service Corps
Sgt. M. J. Unwin, Nottinghamshire and Derbyshire Regiment
Bombardier C. J. Uppington, Royal Field Artillery
Drummer D. G. Urquhart, Royal Welsh Fusiliers
L./Sgt. G. Urquhart, York and Lancaster Regiment
2nd Cpl. (Acting Cpl.) J. Vick, Royal Engineers
Sgt. J. Viggers, East Kent Regiment
L./C. A. Vincent, Royal Scots Fusiliers
Sgt. J. Vincent, Royal Field Artillery
L./C. T. W. Vincent, Oxfordshire and Buckinghamshire Light Infantry
L./C. A. C. Wagstaff, Manchester Regiment
Sgt. A. J. Walker, Middlesex Regiment
Pte. (Acting Cpl.) B. Walker, Army Service Corps
Pte. C. A. Walker, Royal Welsh Fusiliers
Pte. J. Walker, Somerset Light Infantry
Pte. P. T. Walker, Oxfordshire and Buckinghamshire Light Infantry
Sgt. T. Walker, Royal Engineers
Sgt. S. W. G. Walker, Duke of Cornwall's Light Infantry
L./C. J. Wallace, Royal Highlanders
Pte. J. Walsh, Royal Munster Fusiliers
Sgt. (Acting Company Sgt-Maj.) J.W. Walter, Army Service Corps
Sgt. S. G. Walters, Devon Regiment
Cpl. (Acting Sgt.) A. J. Ward, Northamptonshire Regiment
Acting Cpl. W. Ward, Rifle Brigade
L./C. S. Warrick, Lincolnshire Regiment
Bombardier W. J. Waters, Royal Field Artillery
Pte. T. Watson, 2nd Dragoons
Pte. T. Watson, Argyll and Sutherland Highlanders
Flight Sgt. M. Weare, Royal Flying Corps
Pte. P. Wearn, Wiltshire Regiment
Driver W. D. Weaver, Royal Field Artillery
Sgt. J. E. Webb, South Lancashire Regiment
Pte. W. R. Webb, West Riding Regiment
Sapper F. Webster, Royal Engineers
Pte. J. Wedgwood, Border Regiment
Acting Sgt. J. Wellington, Shropshire Light Infantry
Sgt. F. Wells, London Regiment
Pte. L. Wells, London Regiment
Sapper (Acting L./C.) E. W. Welsh, Royal Engineers
Sgt. (Acting Company Sgt-Maj.) A. West, Royal West Surrey Regiment
Pte. P. F. West, Bedfordshire Regiment
L./C. M. Westmoreland, Grenadier Guards
Sapper H. Wharton, Royal Engineers
Cpl. U. Wheatley, Dirham Light Infantry
Pte. G. A. White, King's Royal Rifle Company
Bombardier L. G. White, Royal Field Artillery
Acting Cpl. M. White, East Lancashire Regiment
L./C. R. White, Northumberland Fusiliers
Gunner T. A. White, Royal Field Artillery
Cpl. (Acting Sgt.) W. D. White, Royal Engineers
Gunner A. F. Whitefield, Royal Field Artillery
L./C. A. E. Whitlock, Royal Fusiliers
Sgt. C. F. Whiteman, Rifle Brigade
L./C. A. Whyte, Argyll and Sutherland Highlanders
Pte. G. Whyte, Royal Munster Fusiliers
Sgt. R. A. Wickens, Royal Berkshire Regiment
Sgt. T. Widd, l/4th Bn., South Lancashire Regiment
Pte. J. Wilde, York and Lancaster Regiment
Cpl. F. J. Wilkins, Royal Field Artillery
Sgt. S. Wilkinson, Northumberland Fusiliers
Cpl. A. Williams, Somerset Light Infantry
Pte. H. Williams, Royal Lancashire Regiment
Sgt. J. Williams, Scots Rifles
Acting Sgt. J. Williams, West Yorkshire Regiment
Pte. O. Williams, Royal Welsh Fusiliers
Pte. S. Williams, Border Regiment
Pte. W. G. Williams, Liverpool Regiment
Sgt. C. A. Wilmhurst, Royal Sussex Regiment
Pte. C. Wilsher, Bedfordshire Regiment
L./C. A. Wilson, Argyll and Sutherland Highlanders
L./C. A. Wilson, Argyll and Sutherland Highlanders
Pte. E. Wilson, York and Lancaster Regiment
Pte. G. Wilson, Border Regiment
Acting Cpl. T. J. Wilson, Middlesex Regiment
Pte. W. Wilson, King's Owen Scottish Borderers
Gunner H. W. Wilton, Royal Garrison Artillery
Pte. M. Winch, Bedfordshire Regiment
L./C. H. Winkle, Royal Engineers
Gunner A. R. Winn, Royal Field Artillery
Pte. E. W. Winslow, Coldstream Guards
L./C. J. Witherden, Royal West Kent Regiment
Acting Cpl. W. J. Wolfe, Royal Engineers
Cpl. G. Wolsey, A Cyclist Corps.
Pte. A. Wood, Seaforth Highlanders
2nd Cpl. P. Wood, Royal Engineers
Pte. R. Wood, Worcestershire Regiment
L./C. T. C. Wood, Leicestershire Regiment
Pte. J. T. Woodcock, York and Lancaster Regiment
Sgt. J. J. Woodfield, Royal Berkshire Regiment
Sgt. C. Woolley, South Staffordshire Regiment
L./C. H. J. Wootton, Royal Horse Guards
Sgt. J. H. Wortley, Royal Field Artillery
Sgt. A. E. Wright, Royal Field Artillery
L./C. J. Wright, Royal Lancashire Regiment
Sgt. S. E. Wright, Royal Fusiliers
L./C. V. E. Wyber, Royal West Surrey Regiment
Pte. J. Wyllie, Royal Welsh Fusiliers
Acting Sgt. A. Young, Royal Sussex Regiment
Acting Cpl. A. Young, Rifle Brigade
L./C. J. Young, Royal Highlanders

Canadian Contingents
1742 Sgt. M. Allan, Princess Patricia's Canadian Light Infantry
Sgt. H. Ashby, 7th Infantry Battalion
Pte. E. Bartlett, 10th Infantry Battalion
Pte. W. Bole, 8th Infantry Battalion
L./C. J. Borland, 18th Infantry Battalion
Pte. G. T. Boyd, 8th Infantry Battalion
Sgt. J. G. Boyes, 16th Infantry Battalion
L./C. H. H. Brown, Canadian Casualty Assembly Centre
Sgt. E. W. Bussell, 2nd Infantry Battalion
Sgt. J. Cameron, 28th Infantry Battalion
Pte. S. G. Chalk, 1st Mounted Rifles Battalion
Acting Cpl. J. L. Collins, 1st Divisional Signal Company Engineers.
Sgt. A. H. Cox, 19th Infantry Battalion
Sgt. J. Crossland, 4th Field Company Engineers
Sgt. W. T. Crummy, 29th Infantry Battalion
Pte. S. Deans, Canadian Army Medical Corps
Acting Sgt. J. Dickie, Princess Patricia's Canadian Light Infantry
Pte. W. Dillabough, 28th Infantry Brigade
Sgt. J. Dungan, 29th Infantry Brigade
Sgt. R. J. Edmunds, 21st Infantry Brigade
Cpl. C. E. Finch, 18th Infantry Brigade
Sgt. J. S. Fraser, 4th Field Company Engineers
Cpl. W. Fullerton, 1st Divisional Signal Company Engineers
Pte. S. Gillespie, 49th Infantry Battalion
2nd Cpl. B. C. Hall, 1st Field Company Engineers
Pte. E. Hancock, 18th Inf. Bn.
L./C. A. A. Harper, 13th Infantry Battalion
Pte. T. Hodgson, 14th Infantry Battalion
Pte. E. V. Ingram, Royal Canadian Regiment
Bombardier A. Jackson, 15th Battalion Field Artillery
Sgt. M. Jacob, 3rd Brigade, Field Artillery
Pte. A. Jessiman, 27th Infantry Battalion
Sgt. W. Johnson, 2nd Field Company Engineers
L./C. A. H. Jones, 18th Infantry Battalion
Sgt. W. J. Kingman, 42nd Infantry Battalion
Staff Sgt. Wheeler. C. Landry, Canadian Army Service Corps
Sgt. J. R. Lane, 5th Field Company Engineers
L./C. E. Lawson, 18th Infantry Battalion
Sgt. W. S. Lawson, 11th Battalion Field Artillery
Sgt. H. Lock, 1st Infantry Battalion
Sgt. A. McK. Macdonald, 49th Infantry Battalion
Acting Company Sgt-Maj. H. Marshall, 15th Infantry Battalion
Sgt. C. A. Martin, 19th Alberta Dragoons
Sgt. G. L. Matheson, 25th Infantry Battalion
Cpl. (Acting Sgt.) A. McBride, 1st Brigade, Field Artillery
Sgt. H. McBride, 21st Infantry Battalion
Pte. A. McCaughan, 10th Infantry Battalion
Transport Sgt. R. McCleary, 3rd Infantry Battalion
Pte. A. McDiarmid, 7th Infantry Battalion
Sjt. F. S. McPherson, 1st Divisional Signal Company
Cpl. A. Metzer, 39th Infantry Battalion
Pte. R. Miller, 1st Infantry Battalion
Sgt. R. Monahan, 2nd Brigade Field Artillery
L./Sjt. C. Moore, 42nd Infantry Battalion
Cpl. H. P. Morgan, 31st Infantry Battalion
Pte. A. F. Mott, 24th Infantry Battalion
Sgt. G. Nuttall, 10th Infantry Battalion
Pte. J. Payne, 16th Infantry Battalion
L./C. F. Pegamegabow, 1st Infantry Battalion
Sgt. L. Rancourt, 22nd Infantry Battalion
Cpl. S. Reid, 3rd Field Company Engineers
Cpl. L. J. Rimmer, 10th Infantry Battalion
Sgt. F. Rothery, 4th Infantry Battalion
Staff Sgt. F. V. Scott, Canadian Cavalry Brigade, Machine Gun Squadron
Cpl. R. Scott, 14th Infantry Battalion
Pte. W. Sharland, 2nd Mounted Rifles Battalion
Pte. C. E. Sheppard, 3rd Divisional Signal Company
Staff Stg. Armt. Artificer C. K. Smith, 1st Brigade, Field Artillery
Pte. H. Tate, 8th Infantry Battalion
Sgt. V. W. Unwin, 2nd Infantry Battalion
Driver F. Waghorn, 1st Motor Machine Gun Brigade
Pte. F. J. Watson, 1st Infantry Battalion
L./C. J. Watt, 22nd Infantry Battalion
Pte. K. Weir, 7th Infantry Battalion
Sgt. A. S. Whiteacre, 3rd Infantry Battalion
Pte. H. J. Williams, 3rd Infantry Battalion
Pte. L. J. Williams, 21st Infantry Battalion
L./C. P. H. Witney, 10th Infantry Battalion

References

Birthday Honours
1916 awards
1916 in Australia
1916 in Canada
1916 in India
1916 in New Zealand
1916 in the United Kingdom